This is a partial list of unnumbered minor planets for principal provisional designations assigned during 1–15 February 2002. , a total of 407 bodies remain unnumbered for this period. Objects for this year are listed on the following pages: A–B · C · D–F · G–K · L–O · P · Qi · Qii · Ri · Rii · S · Ti · Tii · U–V and W–Y. Also see previous and next year.

C 

|- id="2002 CY" bgcolor=#d6d6d6
| 0 || 2002 CY || MBA-O || 16.80 || 2.4 km || multiple || 2000–2021 || 02 Dec 2021 || 152 || align=left | Disc.: ADASAlt.: 2010 LU45 || 
|- id="2002 CF1" bgcolor=#d6d6d6
| 0 ||  || MBA-O || 15.87 || 3.7 km || multiple || 1999–2021 || 08 Nov 2021 || 206 || align=left | Disc.: ADAS || 
|- id="2002 CP4" bgcolor=#FFC2E0
| 6 ||  || AMO || 21.1 || data-sort-value="0.21" | 210 m || single || 32 days || 09 Mar 2002 || 28 || align=left | Disc.: AMOS || 
|- id="2002 CQ6" bgcolor=#FA8072
| 1 ||  || MCA || 17.2 || 1.1 km || multiple || 2002–2020 || 26 May 2020 || 83 || align=left | Disc.: LINEAR || 
|- id="2002 CZ8" bgcolor=#d6d6d6
| 0 ||  || MBA-O || 17.52 || 1.7 km || multiple || 2002–2021 || 09 Aug 2021 || 34 || align=left | Disc.: LPL/Spacewatch II || 
|- id="2002 CY9" bgcolor=#FFC2E0
| 2 ||  || APO || 19.2 || data-sort-value="0.51" | 510 m || multiple || 2002–2020 || 21 Jul 2020 || 86 || align=left | Disc.: LINEARPotentially hazardous object || 
|- id="2002 CR11" bgcolor=#FFC2E0
| 2 ||  || AMO || 20.2 || data-sort-value="0.32" | 320 m || multiple || 2002–2006 || 08 Jan 2006 || 40 || align=left | Disc.: LONEOS || 
|- id="2002 CS11" bgcolor=#FFC2E0
| 5 ||  || AMO || 21.4 || data-sort-value="0.19" | 190 m || single || 61 days || 08 Apr 2002 || 49 || align=left | Disc.: LINEAR || 
|- id="2002 CV11" bgcolor=#FFC2E0
| 8 ||  || APO || 23.8 || data-sort-value="0.062" | 62 m || single || 7 days || 14 Feb 2002 || 22 || align=left | Disc.: LINEAR || 
|- id="2002 CW11" bgcolor=#FFC2E0
| 8 ||  || ATE || 26.1 || data-sort-value="0.021" | 21 m || single || 14 days || 21 Feb 2002 || 30 || align=left | Disc.: LPL/Spacewatch II || 
|- id="2002 CC14" bgcolor=#FFC2E0
| 8 ||  || ATE || 24.8 || data-sort-value="0.039" | 39 m || single || 7 days || 14 Feb 2002 || 43 || align=left | Disc.: LINEAR || 
|- id="2002 CD14" bgcolor=#FFC2E0
| 0 ||  || APO || 20.42 || data-sort-value="0.29" | 290 m || multiple || 2002–2021 || 07 Nov 2021 || 87 || align=left | Disc.: LPL/Spacewatch IIPotentially hazardous object || 
|- id="2002 CG14" bgcolor=#FA8072
| 0 ||  || MCA || 17.3 || 1.0 km || multiple || 2002–2021 || 08 Jun 2021 || 200 || align=left | Disc.: LINEAR || 
|- id="2002 CK15" bgcolor=#FA8072
| – ||  || MCA || 18.6 || 1.1 km || single || 29 days || 05 Mar 2002 || 39 || align=left | Disc.: LINEAR || 
|- id="2002 CN15" bgcolor=#FFC2E0
| 4 ||  || APO || 20.8 || data-sort-value="0.25" | 250 m || multiple || 2002–2020 || 24 Nov 2020 || 75 || align=left | Disc.: CSS || 
|- id="2002 CC17" bgcolor=#fefefe
| 0 ||  || HUN || 18.23 || data-sort-value="0.67" | 670 m || multiple || 2002–2021 || 10 May 2021 || 147 || align=left | Disc.: LINEAR || 
|- id="2002 CB19" bgcolor=#FFC2E0
| 3 ||  || APO || 25.0 || data-sort-value="0.036" | 36 m || multiple || 2002–2018 || 05 Feb 2018 || 35 || align=left | Disc.: LINEAR || 
|- id="2002 CZ25" bgcolor=#FA8072
| 4 ||  || HUN || 19.6 || data-sort-value="0.36" | 360 m || multiple || 2002–2010 || 14 Mar 2010 || 39 || align=left | Disc.: NEAT || 
|- id="2002 CA26" bgcolor=#FFC2E0
| 8 ||  || APO || 27.3 || data-sort-value="0.012" | 12 m || single || 4 days || 12 Feb 2002 || 14 || align=left | Disc.: LINEAR || 
|- id="2002 CB26" bgcolor=#FFC2E0
| 8 ||  || APO || 26.9 || data-sort-value="0.015" | 15 m || single || 4 days || 14 Feb 2002 || 16 || align=left | Disc.: LINEAR || 
|- id="2002 CC26" bgcolor=#FFC2E0
| 2 ||  || AMO || 24.4 || data-sort-value="0.047" | 47 m || multiple || 2002–2019 || 12 Feb 2019 || 71 || align=left | Disc.: LINEARAlt.: 2019 CM1 || 
|- id="2002 CD26" bgcolor=#FA8072
| 1 ||  || MCA || 19.2 || data-sort-value="0.43" | 430 m || multiple || 2002–2020 || 23 May 2020 || 281 || align=left | Disc.: LINEAR || 
|- id="2002 CE37" bgcolor=#E9E9E9
| 0 ||  || MBA-M || 17.1 || 1.6 km || multiple || 2002–2020 || 30 May 2020 || 87 || align=left | Disc.: LINEARAlt.: 2015 FT119 || 
|- id="2002 CZ43" bgcolor=#fefefe
| 0 ||  || HUN || 19.20 || data-sort-value="0.43" | 430 m || multiple || 2002–2021 || 14 Aug 2021 || 59 || align=left | Disc.: LINEAR || 
|- id="2002 CD44" bgcolor=#fefefe
| 1 ||  || HUN || 18.9 || data-sort-value="0.49" | 490 m || multiple || 2002–2020 || 27 Jan 2020 || 59 || align=left | Disc.: LINEARAlt.: 2013 QF17 || 
|- id="2002 CG44" bgcolor=#fefefe
| 2 ||  || HUN || 18.8 || data-sort-value="0.52" | 520 m || multiple || 2002–2021 || 17 May 2021 || 40 || align=left | Disc.: LINEARAlt.: 2019 OZ33 || 
|- id="2002 CS44" bgcolor=#fefefe
| 0 ||  || MBA-I || 17.6 || data-sort-value="0.90" | 900 m || multiple || 2002–2021 || 18 Jan 2021 || 86 || align=left | Disc.: LPL/Spacewatch II || 
|- id="2002 CT46" bgcolor=#FFC2E0
| 3 ||  || AMO || 20.8 || data-sort-value="0.25" | 250 m || single || 83 days || 05 May 2002 || 103 || align=left | Disc.: NEAT || 
|- id="2002 CU46" bgcolor=#FFC2E0
| 5 ||  || APO || 21.1 || data-sort-value="0.21" | 210 m || single || 21 days || 03 Mar 2002 || 55 || align=left | Disc.: LINEAR || 
|- id="2002 CV46" bgcolor=#FFC2E0
| 1 ||  || AMO || 21.3 || data-sort-value="0.20" | 200 m || multiple || 2002–2014 || 30 Aug 2014 || 57 || align=left | Disc.: LINEAR || 
|- id="2002 CG50" bgcolor=#E9E9E9
| 0 ||  || MBA-M || 17.0 || 1.7 km || multiple || 2002–2020 || 21 May 2020 || 141 || align=left | Disc.: Desert Eagle Obs.Alt.: 2011 FU78 || 
|- id="2002 CJ50" bgcolor=#E9E9E9
| 0 ||  || MBA-M || 18.1 || 1.5 km || multiple || 2000–2019 || 07 May 2019 || 60 || align=left | Disc.: Desert Eagle Obs.Alt.: 2010 BS67 || 
|- id="2002 CG58" bgcolor=#fefefe
| 2 ||  || HUN || 19.3 || data-sort-value="0.41" | 410 m || multiple || 2002–2021 || 01 Apr 2021 || 33 || align=left | Disc.: LPL/Spacewatch II || 
|- id="2002 CX58" bgcolor=#FFC2E0
| 0 ||  || APO || 22.3 || data-sort-value="0.12" | 120 m || multiple || 2002–2016 || 07 Jun 2016 || 184 || align=left | Disc.: LINEAR || 
|- id="2002 CS65" bgcolor=#d6d6d6
| 0 ||  || MBA-O || 16.41 || 2.9 km || multiple || 2002–2021 || 06 Nov 2021 || 107 || align=left | Disc.: LINEAR || 
|- id="2002 CO71" bgcolor=#fefefe
| 0 ||  || MBA-I || 17.45 || data-sort-value="0.96" | 960 m || multiple || 2002–2021 || 29 Apr 2021 || 166 || align=left | Disc.: LINEARAlt.: 2008 XR10, 2013 CG209, 2015 PR295 || 
|- id="2002 CN76" bgcolor=#E9E9E9
| 1 ||  || MBA-M || 17.7 || 1.2 km || multiple || 2002–2020 || 16 Jun 2020 || 142 || align=left | Disc.: LINEAR || 
|- id="2002 CF77" bgcolor=#E9E9E9
| 0 ||  || MBA-M || 16.88 || 1.3 km || multiple || 2002–2020 || 16 Oct 2020 || 102 || align=left | Disc.: LINEAR || 
|- id="2002 CV79" bgcolor=#FA8072
| 0 ||  || MCA || 17.83 || 1.1 km || multiple || 2002–2019 || 27 May 2019 || 105 || align=left | Disc.: LINEAR || 
|- id="2002 CC85" bgcolor=#d6d6d6
| 0 ||  || MBA-O || 17.38 || 1.9 km || multiple || 2002–2021 || 09 Aug 2021 || 77 || align=left | Disc.: LINEAR || 
|- id="2002 CT85" bgcolor=#fefefe
| 0 ||  || MBA-I || 18.17 || data-sort-value="0.69" | 690 m || multiple || 2002–2021 || 09 May 2021 || 122 || align=left | Disc.: LINEARAlt.: 2006 DW34 || 
|- id="2002 CW85" bgcolor=#d6d6d6
| 0 ||  || MBA-O || 16.36 || 3.0 km || multiple || 2002–2021 || 11 Oct 2021 || 74 || align=left | Disc.: LINEAR || 
|- id="2002 CB89" bgcolor=#fefefe
| 0 ||  || MBA-I || 17.63 || data-sort-value="0.89" | 890 m || multiple || 2002–2021 || 11 May 2021 || 144 || align=left | Disc.: LINEARAlt.: 2008 WS82, 2017 CE4, 2017 DS68 || 
|- id="2002 CG89" bgcolor=#fefefe
| 3 ||  || MBA-I || 17.7 || data-sort-value="0.86" | 860 m || multiple || 2002–2013 || 19 Feb 2013 || 31 || align=left | Disc.: LINEARAlt.: 2013 BF29 || 
|- id="2002 CO92" bgcolor=#d6d6d6
| 0 ||  || MBA-O || 17.17 || 2.0 km || multiple || 2002–2021 || 13 Sep 2021 || 50 || align=left | Disc.: LINEAR || 
|- id="2002 CC116" bgcolor=#d6d6d6
| 2 ||  || MBA-O || 17.9 || 1.5 km || multiple || 2002–2018 || 19 Mar 2018 || 60 || align=left | Disc.: LINEAR || 
|- id="2002 CD116" bgcolor=#E9E9E9
| 0 ||  || MBA-M || 16.72 || 2.5 km || multiple || 2002–2021 || 29 Aug 2021 || 186 || align=left | Disc.: Ondřejov Obs.Alt.: 2011 BJ62 || 
|- id="2002 CW116" bgcolor=#E9E9E9
| 4 ||  || MBA-M || 16.4 || 2.2 km || single || 65 days || 17 Feb 2002 || 18 || align=left | Disc.: NEAT || 
|- id="2002 CH124" bgcolor=#E9E9E9
| 0 ||  || MBA-M || 17.3 || 1.5 km || multiple || 2002–2020 || 22 May 2020 || 120 || align=left | Disc.: LINEARAlt.: 2015 BP41 || 
|- id="2002 CL124" bgcolor=#fefefe
| 1 ||  || MBA-I || 17.7 || data-sort-value="0.86" | 860 m || multiple || 2002–2020 || 20 Jan 2020 || 69 || align=left | Disc.: LINEARAlt.: 2013 CA46 || 
|- id="2002 CB127" bgcolor=#E9E9E9
| 0 ||  || MBA-M || 16.86 || 1.8 km || multiple || 2000–2021 || 26 Nov 2021 || 133 || align=left | Disc.: LINEAR || 
|- id="2002 CT133" bgcolor=#fefefe
| 1 ||  || MBA-I || 17.4 || data-sort-value="0.98" | 980 m || multiple || 2002–2020 || 25 May 2020 || 218 || align=left | Disc.: LINEAR || 
|- id="2002 CV135" bgcolor=#E9E9E9
| 2 ||  || MBA-M || 17.4 || 1.4 km || multiple || 2002–2020 || 14 Aug 2020 || 84 || align=left | Disc.: LINEAR || 
|- id="2002 CO142" bgcolor=#E9E9E9
| 0 ||  || MBA-M || 16.62 || 2.0 km || multiple || 2002–2021 || 08 Sep 2021 || 212 || align=left | Disc.: LINEARAlt.: 2018 VT2 || 
|- id="2002 CS148" bgcolor=#E9E9E9
| 0 ||  || MBA-M || 18.1 || 1.0 km || multiple || 2002–2020 || 21 Jun 2020 || 45 || align=left | Disc.: LINEARAlt.: 2015 FF8 || 
|- id="2002 CY148" bgcolor=#fefefe
| 0 ||  || MBA-I || 17.7 || data-sort-value="0.86" | 860 m || multiple || 2000–2020 || 14 Feb 2020 || 123 || align=left | Disc.: LINEARAlt.: 2015 VN91 || 
|- id="2002 CH150" bgcolor=#fefefe
| 0 ||  || MBA-I || 18.0 || data-sort-value="0.75" | 750 m || multiple || 2002–2020 || 25 Mar 2020 || 93 || align=left | Disc.: LINEARAlt.: 2004 TP97 || 
|- id="2002 CR152" bgcolor=#FA8072
| 1 ||  || MCA || 18.9 || data-sort-value="0.49" | 490 m || multiple || 2002–2017 || 16 Aug 2017 || 59 || align=left | Disc.: LINEARAlt.: 2013 BZ41 || 
|- id="2002 CO154" bgcolor=#C2E0FF
| E ||  || TNO || 6.5 || 172 km || single || 37 days || 15 Mar 2002 || 9 || align=left | Disc.: Kitt Peak Obs.LoUTNOs, cubewano? || 
|- id="2002 CP154" bgcolor=#C2E0FF
| 6 ||  || TNO || 6.5 || 209 km || multiple || 2002–2013 || 14 Mar 2013 || 8 || align=left | Disc.: Kitt Peak Obs.LoUTNOs, other TNO || 
|- id="2002 CQ154" bgcolor=#C2E0FF
| E ||  || TNO || 6.4 || 180 km || single || 42 days || 20 Mar 2002 || 9 || align=left | Disc.: Kitt Peak Obs.LoUTNOs, cubewano? || 
|- id="2002 CR154" bgcolor=#C2E0FF
| E ||  || TNO || 7.0 || 137 km || single || 31 days || 09 Mar 2002 || 5 || align=left | Disc.: Kitt Peak Obs.LoUTNOs, cubewano? || 
|- id="2002 CS154" bgcolor=#C2E0FF
| 3 ||  || TNO || 6.8 || 145 km || multiple || 2002–2018 || 10 Apr 2018 || 21 || align=left | Disc.: Kitt Peak Obs.LoUTNOs, cubewano (cold) || 
|- id="2002 CT154" bgcolor=#C2E0FF
| 4 ||  || TNO || 7.17 || 122 km || multiple || 2001–2021 || 12 May 2021 || 28 || align=left | Disc.: Kitt Peak Obs.LoUTNOs, cubewano (cold) || 
|- id="2002 CU154" bgcolor=#C2E0FF
| 2 ||  || TNO || 6.8 || 145 km || multiple || 2002–2015 || 15 Apr 2015 || 26 || align=left | Disc.: Kitt Peak Obs.LoUTNOs, cubewano (cold) || 
|- id="2002 CV154" bgcolor=#C2E0FF
| E ||  || TNO || 6.1 || 207 km || single || 31 days || 09 Mar 2002 || 5 || align=left | Disc.: Kitt Peak Obs.LoUTNOs, cubewano? || 
|- id="2002 CW154" bgcolor=#C2E0FF
| E ||  || TNO || 6.4 || 218 km || single || 1 day || 07 Feb 2002 || 3 || align=left | Disc.: Kitt Peak Obs.LoUTNOs, other TNO || 
|- id="2002 CY154" bgcolor=#C2E0FF
| 4 ||  || TNO || 6.70 || 152 km || multiple || 2002–2021 || 20 Mar 2021 || 25 || align=left | Disc.: Kitt Peak Obs.LoUTNOs, cubewano (cold) || 
|- id="2002 CZ154" bgcolor=#C2E0FF
| 3 ||  || TNO || 7.52 || 161 km || multiple || 2002–2021 || 12 May 2021 || 21 || align=left | Disc.: Kitt Peak Obs.LoUTNOs, cubewano (hot) || 
|- id="2002 CF158" bgcolor=#d6d6d6
| 0 ||  || MBA-O || 15.7 || 4.0 km || multiple || 2002–2019 || 05 Apr 2019 || 148 || align=left | Disc.: LINEARAlt.: 2006 VS12, 2013 AY71 || 
|- id="2002 CK160" bgcolor=#E9E9E9
| 1 ||  || MBA-M || 16.7 || 1.9 km || multiple || 2001–2020 || 27 Apr 2020 || 140 || align=left | Disc.: LINEAR || 
|- id="2002 CY161" bgcolor=#FA8072
| 2 ||  || MCA || 17.5 || 1.8 km || multiple || 2002–2012 || 04 Jan 2012 || 71 || align=left | Disc.: LINEAR || 
|- id="2002 CX174" bgcolor=#FA8072
| 1 ||  || MCA || 16.9 || 2.3 km || multiple || 2002–2018 || 17 May 2018 || 263 || align=left | Disc.: LINEAR || 
|- id="2002 CY175" bgcolor=#d6d6d6
| 0 ||  || MBA-O || 16.96 || 2.3 km || multiple || 2002–2021 || 02 Oct 2021 || 111 || align=left | Disc.: LINEARAlt.: 2013 EG94 || 
|- id="2002 CH178" bgcolor=#d6d6d6
| 0 ||  || MBA-O || 16.65 || 2.6 km || multiple || 2002–2021 || 10 Sep 2021 || 94 || align=left | Disc.: LINEARAlt.: 2013 CM178 || 
|- id="2002 CZ179" bgcolor=#E9E9E9
| 0 ||  || MBA-M || 18.28 || data-sort-value="0.66" | 660 m || multiple || 2002–2021 || 03 Oct 2021 || 61 || align=left | Disc.: LINEARAlt.: 2017 SE156 || 
|- id="2002 CK182" bgcolor=#fefefe
| 0 ||  || MBA-I || 18.69 || data-sort-value="0.54" | 540 m || multiple || 2002–2021 || 12 Nov 2021 || 50 || align=left | Disc.: LINEAR || 
|- id="2002 CD184" bgcolor=#E9E9E9
| 2 ||  || MBA-M || 17.4 || 1.8 km || multiple || 2002–2020 || 24 Mar 2020 || 53 || align=left | Disc.: LINEARAdded on 22 July 2020 || 
|- id="2002 CP185" bgcolor=#fefefe
| 0 ||  || MBA-I || 18.0 || data-sort-value="0.75" | 750 m || multiple || 2002–2021 || 16 Jan 2021 || 113 || align=left | Disc.: LINEARAlt.: 2006 BO258 || 
|- id="2002 CA186" bgcolor=#fefefe
| 0 ||  || MBA-I || 18.2 || data-sort-value="0.68" | 680 m || multiple || 2002–2020 || 26 Feb 2020 || 57 || align=left | Disc.: LINEARAdded on 22 July 2020 || 
|- id="2002 CH187" bgcolor=#d6d6d6
| 0 ||  || MBA-O || 16.46 || 2.8 km || multiple || 2002–2021 || 09 Sep 2021 || 167 || align=left | Disc.: LINEAR || 
|- id="2002 CY187" bgcolor=#E9E9E9
| 0 ||  || MBA-M || 17.30 || 1.9 km || multiple || 2000–2021 || 03 May 2021 || 100 || align=left | Disc.: LINEAR || 
|- id="2002 CH188" bgcolor=#d6d6d6
| 0 ||  || MBA-O || 16.9 || 2.3 km || multiple || 2002–2021 || 30 Sep 2021 || 51 || align=left | Disc.: LINEAR || 
|- id="2002 CT189" bgcolor=#d6d6d6
| 0 ||  || MBA-O || 16.77 || 2.5 km || multiple || 2002–2021 || 23 Nov 2021 || 86 || align=left | Disc.: LINEAR || 
|- id="2002 CY190" bgcolor=#E9E9E9
| 2 ||  || MBA-M || 18.89 || data-sort-value="0.50" | 500 m || multiple || 2002–2019 || 29 Jun 2019 || 34 || align=left | Disc.: LINEAR || 
|- id="2002 CA192" bgcolor=#E9E9E9
| 0 ||  || MBA-M || 17.92 || data-sort-value="0.77" | 770 m || multiple || 2002–2021 || 08 Dec 2021 || 47 || align=left | Disc.: LINEAR || 
|- id="2002 CF193" bgcolor=#E9E9E9
| 0 ||  || MBA-M || 16.52 || 2.8 km || multiple || 2002–2021 || 08 Apr 2021 || 254 || align=left | Disc.: LINEARAlt.: 2014 SJ288, 2016 CQ222 || 
|- id="2002 CO193" bgcolor=#d6d6d6
| 0 ||  || MBA-O || 17.00 || 2.2 km || multiple || 2002–2021 || 27 Dec 2021 || 75 || align=left | Disc.: LINEARAdded on 24 December 2021 || 
|- id="2002 CY193" bgcolor=#E9E9E9
| – ||  || MBA-M || 16.9 || 1.2 km || single || 10 days || 20 Feb 2002 || 12 || align=left | Disc.: LINEAR || 
|- id="2002 CL194" bgcolor=#E9E9E9
| 0 ||  || MBA-M || 17.19 || 2.0 km || multiple || 2002–2021 || 08 Apr 2021 || 90 || align=left | Disc.: LINEARAlt.: 2011 AO26 || 
|- id="2002 CD196" bgcolor=#E9E9E9
| 0 ||  || MBA-M || 16.64 || 1.4 km || multiple || 2002–2022 || 21 Jan 2022 || 98 || align=left | Disc.: LINEARAlt.: 2008 SG30, 2010 FR67 || 
|- id="2002 CR196" bgcolor=#fefefe
| 0 ||  || MBA-I || 18.80 || data-sort-value="0.52" | 520 m || multiple || 2002–2021 || 13 Jul 2021 || 33 || align=left | Disc.: LINEAR || 
|- id="2002 CL197" bgcolor=#E9E9E9
| 0 ||  || MBA-M || 17.4 || 1.8 km || multiple || 2002-2021 || 01 Nov 2021 || 42 || align=left | Disc.: LINEAR || 
|- id="2002 CV197" bgcolor=#E9E9E9
| 1 ||  || MBA-M || 18.36 || data-sort-value="0.63" | 630 m || multiple || 2002–2021 || 26 Nov 2021 || 62 || align=left | Disc.: LINEAR || 
|- id="2002 CZ197" bgcolor=#fefefe
| 0 ||  || MBA-I || 18.0 || data-sort-value="0.75" | 750 m || multiple || 2002–2020 || 05 Jan 2020 || 75 || align=left | Disc.: LINEARAlt.: 2014 OG364 || 
|- id="2002 CN199" bgcolor=#E9E9E9
| 0 ||  || MBA-M || 16.89 || 1.2 km || multiple || 2002–2022 || 15 Jan 2022 || 220 || align=left | Disc.: LINEARAlt.: 2010 FY77 || 
|- id="2002 CV204" bgcolor=#fefefe
| 0 ||  || MBA-I || 17.5 || data-sort-value="0.94" | 940 m || multiple || 2002–2021 || 14 Jan 2021 || 100 || align=left | Disc.: LINEARAlt.: 2010 MH125 || 
|- id="2002 CB210" bgcolor=#d6d6d6
| 0 ||  || MBA-O || 16.44 || 2.9 km || multiple || 2002–2021 || 26 Nov 2021 || 157 || align=left | Disc.: LINEAR || 
|- id="2002 CA212" bgcolor=#fefefe
| 0 ||  || MBA-I || 17.9 || data-sort-value="0.78" | 780 m || multiple || 2002–2021 || 18 Jan 2021 || 76 || align=left | Disc.: LINEAR || 
|- id="2002 CA222" bgcolor=#fefefe
| 0 ||  || MBA-I || 18.0 || data-sort-value="0.75" | 750 m || multiple || 2000–2020 || 02 Feb 2020 || 119 || align=left | Disc.: LINEARAlt.: 2006 FJ23, 2013 CZ192 || 
|- id="2002 CW224" bgcolor=#C2E0FF
| 3 ||  || TNO || 7.14 || 176 km || multiple || 2001–2021 || 11 Jan 2021 || 42 || align=left | Disc.: Kitt Peak Obs.LoUTNOs, plutino || 
|- id="2002 CX224" bgcolor=#C2E0FF
| 2 ||  || TNO || 6.0 || 263 km || multiple || 2001–2017 || 20 Dec 2017 || 26 || align=left | Disc.: Kitt Peak Obs.LoUTNOs, other TNO || 
|- id="2002 CZ224" bgcolor=#C2E0FF
| 3 ||  || TNO || 7.0 || 132 km || multiple || 2002–2013 || 14 Mar 2013 || 31 || align=left | Disc.: Kitt Peak Obs.LoUTNOs, cubewano (cold) || 
|- id="2002 CA225" bgcolor=#C2E0FF
| E ||  || TNO || 7.2 || 125 km || single || 34 days || 13 Mar 2002 || 6 || align=left | Disc.: Kitt Peak Obs.LoUTNOs, cubewano? || 
|- id="2002 CB225" bgcolor=#C2E0FF
| 4 ||  || TNO || 7.25 || 118 km || multiple || 2002–2021 || 20 Mar 2021 || 28 || align=left | Disc.: Kitt Peak Obs.LoUTNOs, cubewano (cold) || 
|- id="2002 CC225" bgcolor=#FA8072
| – ||  || MCA || 19.9 || data-sort-value="0.44" | 440 m || single || 5 days || 18 Feb 2002 || 9 || align=left | Disc.: Bohyunsan Obs. || 
|- id="2002 CJ226" bgcolor=#d6d6d6
| 0 ||  || MBA-O || 16.9 || 2.3 km || multiple || 2000–2021 || 17 Jan 2021 || 227 || align=left | Disc.: AMOSAlt.: 2010 VH214 || 
|- id="2002 CV227" bgcolor=#d6d6d6
| 0 ||  || MBA-O || 16.72 || 2.5 km || multiple || 2002–2021 || 13 Jul 2021 || 68 || align=left | Disc.: NEATAlt.: 2013 AK14 || 
|- id="2002 CX228" bgcolor=#E9E9E9
| 0 ||  || MBA-M || 18.4 || data-sort-value="0.88" | 880 m || multiple || 2002–2020 || 21 May 2020 || 33 || align=left | Disc.: LPL/Spacewatch IIAdded on 11 May 2021Alt.: 2011 GL16 || 
|- id="2002 CZ228" bgcolor=#fefefe
| 0 ||  || MBA-I || 18.95 || data-sort-value="0.48" | 480 m || multiple || 2002–2021 || 15 Apr 2021 || 50 || align=left | Disc.: LPL/Spacewatch II || 
|- id="2002 CO229" bgcolor=#E9E9E9
| 0 ||  || MBA-M || 17.1 || 1.1 km || multiple || 1995–2020 || 15 Dec 2020 || 107 || align=left | Disc.: LPL/Spacewatch IIAlt.: 2010 HH98, 2016 TB173 || 
|- id="2002 CP229" bgcolor=#fefefe
| 1 ||  || HUN || 19.84 || data-sort-value="0.32" | 320 m || multiple || 2002–2021 || 15 Aug 2021 || 30 || align=left | Disc.: SpacewatchAlt.: 2015 DG100 || 
|- id="2002 CY230" bgcolor=#fefefe
| 1 ||  || MBA-I || 19.2 || data-sort-value="0.43" | 430 m || multiple || 2002–2018 || 05 Oct 2018 || 31 || align=left | Disc.: Cerro TololoAlt.: 2016 CA114 || 
|- id="2002 CC231" bgcolor=#fefefe
| 1 ||  || MBA-I || 18.7 || data-sort-value="0.54" | 540 m || multiple || 2002–2020 || 16 Feb 2020 || 37 || align=left | Disc.: Cerro TololoAdded on 22 July 2020 || 
|- id="2002 CD231" bgcolor=#d6d6d6
| 0 ||  || MBA-O || 16.58 || 2.7 km || multiple || 2002–2021 || 15 May 2021 || 162 || align=left | Disc.: Cerro Tololo || 
|- id="2002 CK231" bgcolor=#d6d6d6
| 0 ||  || MBA-O || 16.77 || 2.5 km || multiple || 2002–2021 || 10 Apr 2021 || 52 || align=left | Disc.: Cerro TololoAdded on 19 October 2020 || 
|- id="2002 CM231" bgcolor=#E9E9E9
| 3 ||  || MBA-M || 18.4 || data-sort-value="0.88" | 880 m || multiple || 2002–2015 || 19 Feb 2015 || 20 || align=left | Disc.: Cerro Tololo || 
|- id="2002 CN231" bgcolor=#C2FFFF
| 0 ||  || JT || 14.2 || 8.0 km || multiple || 2002–2020 || 05 Nov 2020 || 57 || align=left | Disc.: Cerro TololoAdded on 9 March 2021Greek camp (L4)Alt.: 2008 SD230, 2014 EN206 || 
|- id="2002 CO231" bgcolor=#C2FFFF
| 1 ||  || JT || 14.38 || 7.4 km || multiple || 2002–2021 || 12 Nov 2021 || 93 || align=left | Disc.: Cerro TololoAdded on 9 March 2021Greek camp (L4)Alt.: 2014 EQ206 || 
|- id="2002 CP231" bgcolor=#C2FFFF
| 0 ||  || JT || 14.41 || 7.3 km || multiple || 2002–2021 || 30 Nov 2021 || 130 || align=left | Disc.: Cerro TololoGreek camp (L4)Alt.: 2009 VR15 || 
|- id="2002 CR231" bgcolor=#d6d6d6
| 0 ||  || MBA-O || 16.00 || 3.5 km || multiple || 2002–2021 || 18 Jun 2021 || 155 || align=left | Disc.: Cerro TololoAlt.: 2016 RA15 || 
|- id="2002 CE235" bgcolor=#d6d6d6
| 0 ||  || MBA-O || 17.2 || 2.0 km || multiple || 2002–2019 || 08 May 2019 || 48 || align=left | Disc.: SpacewatchAdded on 22 July 2020 || 
|- id="2002 CN235" bgcolor=#fefefe
| 0 ||  || MBA-I || 18.25 || data-sort-value="0.67" | 670 m || multiple || 2000–2021 || 09 Apr 2021 || 80 || align=left | Disc.: SpacewatchAlt.: 2015 PT106 || 
|- id="2002 CO235" bgcolor=#E9E9E9
| 0 ||  || MBA-M || 17.42 || 1.8 km || multiple || 2002–2021 || 09 Apr 2021 || 115 || align=left | Disc.: SpacewatchAlt.: 2014 QF491, 2016 BH34 || 
|- id="2002 CH246" bgcolor=#E9E9E9
| 0 ||  || MBA-M || 17.1 || 1.6 km || multiple || 2002–2020 || 25 May 2020 || 95 || align=left | Disc.: LPL/Spacewatch IIAlt.: 2015 FZ7 || 
|- id="2002 CZ248" bgcolor=#C2E0FF
| 2 ||  || TNO || 8.2 || 83 km || multiple || 2002–2018 || 09 Dec 2018 || 27 || align=left | Disc.: Kitt Peak Obs.LoUTNOs, res3:7Alt.: 2006 CK69 || 
|- id="2002 CA249" bgcolor=#C7FF8F
| E ||  || CEN || 12.0 || 22 km || single || 37 days || 15 Mar 2002 || 4 || align=left | Disc.: Kitt Peak Obs. || 
|- id="2002 CB249" bgcolor=#C7FF8F
| 5 ||  || CEN || 9.9 || 58 km || single || 69 days || 17 Apr 2002 || 15 || align=left | Disc.: Kitt Peak Obs. || 
|- id="2002 CP249" bgcolor=#d6d6d6
| 0 ||  || MBA-O || 17.4 || 1.8 km || multiple || 2002–2020 || 08 Dec 2020 || 64 || align=left | Disc.: Kitt Peak Obs.Alt.: 2014 OK309 || 
|- id="2002 CW249" bgcolor=#E9E9E9
| 5 ||  || MBA-M || 18.6 || 1.1 km || multiple || 2002–2016 || 05 Feb 2016 || 14 || align=left | Disc.: Kitt Peak Obs.Added on 22 July 2020Alt.: 2016 BH78 || 
|- id="2002 CH250" bgcolor=#d6d6d6
| 0 ||  || MBA-O || 17.00 || 2.2 km || multiple || 2002–2021 || 10 Aug 2021 || 56 || align=left | Disc.: Kitt Peak Obs. || 
|- id="2002 CR250" bgcolor=#d6d6d6
| 0 ||  || MBA-O || 16.77 || 2.5 km || multiple || 2002–2021 || 08 Dec 2021 || 149 || align=left | Disc.: Kitt Peak Obs.Alt.: 2010 TH59, 2013 EF44 || 
|- id="2002 CW250" bgcolor=#E9E9E9
| 0 ||  || MBA-M || 17.53 || 1.7 km || multiple || 2002–2021 || 09 Apr 2021 || 81 || align=left | Disc.: Kitt Peak Obs.Alt.: 2009 SU285 || 
|- id="2002 CY250" bgcolor=#fefefe
| 2 ||  || MBA-I || 19.1 || data-sort-value="0.45" | 450 m || multiple || 2002–2020 || 16 Nov 2020 || 36 || align=left | Disc.: Kitt Peak Obs.Added on 17 January 2021 || 
|- id="2002 CC251" bgcolor=#C2E0FF
| E ||  || TNO || 8.0 || 119 km || single || 42 days || 20 Mar 2002 || 4 || align=left | Disc.: Kitt Peak Obs.LoUTNOs, plutino? || 
|- id="2002 CD251" bgcolor=#C2E0FF
| 3 ||  || TNO || 7.0 || 132 km || multiple || 2002–2013 || 14 Mar 2013 || 21 || align=left | Disc.: Kitt Peak Obs.LoUTNOs, cubewano (cold) || 
|- id="2002 CE251" bgcolor=#C2E0FF
| 2 ||  || TNO || 8.4 || 99 km || multiple || 2002–2015 || 23 Mar 2015 || 23 || align=left | Disc.: Kitt Peak Obs.LoUTNOs, plutino || 
|- id="2002 CP251" bgcolor=#E9E9E9
| 1 ||  || MBA-M || 17.8 || 1.2 km || multiple || 2002–2019 || 01 Apr 2019 || 70 || align=left | Disc.: NEATAlt.: 2010 BS99 || 
|- id="2002 CM253" bgcolor=#E9E9E9
| 0 ||  || MBA-M || 17.14 || 1.6 km || multiple || 2002–2021 || 09 Sep 2021 || 50 || align=left | Disc.: NEAT || 
|- id="2002 CJ255" bgcolor=#E9E9E9
| 0 ||  || MBA-M || 17.5 || 1.3 km || multiple || 2002–2020 || 14 May 2020 || 74 || align=left | Disc.: LPL/Spacewatch IIAlt.: 2015 AF260 || 
|- id="2002 CO255" bgcolor=#E9E9E9
| 3 ||  || MBA-M || 17.0 || 1.7 km || multiple || 2000–2005 || 01 Dec 2005 || 17 || align=left | Disc.: LPL/Spacewatch II || 
|- id="2002 CR255" bgcolor=#d6d6d6
| 0 ||  || MBA-O || 16.4 || 2.9 km || multiple || 2002–2019 || 05 Apr 2019 || 86 || align=left | Disc.: Kitt Peak Obs.Alt.: 2013 BZ79 || 
|- id="2002 CK257" bgcolor=#d6d6d6
| 0 ||  || MBA-O || 16.8 || 2.4 km || multiple || 2002–2020 || 16 Dec 2020 || 122 || align=left | Disc.: Kitt Peak Obs. || 
|- id="2002 CO257" bgcolor=#fefefe
| 0 ||  || MBA-I || 17.9 || data-sort-value="0.78" | 780 m || multiple || 2002–2020 || 21 Apr 2020 || 130 || align=left | Disc.: Kitt Peak Obs.Alt.: 2013 EH36, 2014 OA310 || 
|- id="2002 CM258" bgcolor=#E9E9E9
| 0 ||  || MBA-M || 17.7 || 1.2 km || multiple || 2002–2020 || 22 Mar 2020 || 35 || align=left | Disc.: Kitt Peak Obs.Added on 22 July 2020 || 
|- id="2002 CF259" bgcolor=#fefefe
| 0 ||  || HUN || 19.68 || data-sort-value="0.34" | 340 m || multiple || 2002–2021 || 07 Nov 2021 || 48 || align=left | Disc.: Kitt Peak Obs.Added on 30 September 2021 || 
|- id="2002 CO259" bgcolor=#d6d6d6
| 0 ||  || MBA-O || 16.18 || 3.2 km || multiple || 2002–2021 || 09 Oct 2021 || 193 || align=left | Disc.: Kitt Peak Obs. || 
|- id="2002 CW259" bgcolor=#fefefe
| 0 ||  || MBA-I || 18.36 || data-sort-value="0.63" | 630 m || multiple || 2002–2021 || 08 Nov 2021 || 66 || align=left | Disc.: Spacewatch || 
|- id="2002 CA260" bgcolor=#fefefe
| 0 ||  || MBA-I || 18.79 || data-sort-value="0.52" | 520 m || multiple || 2002–2021 || 13 Apr 2021 || 40 || align=left | Disc.: SpacewatchAdded on 19 October 2020 || 
|- id="2002 CB260" bgcolor=#d6d6d6
| 0 ||  || MBA-O || 16.44 || 2.9 km || multiple || 2002–2021 || 06 Aug 2021 || 76 || align=left | Disc.: LINEAR || 
|- id="2002 CH260" bgcolor=#FA8072
| 3 ||  || MCA || 18.5 || data-sort-value="0.84" | 840 m || multiple || 2002–2019 || 26 Feb 2019 || 40 || align=left | Disc.: NEATAlt.: 2019 AH9 || 
|- id="2002 CE261" bgcolor=#E9E9E9
| 0 ||  || MBA-M || 17.41 || 1.8 km || multiple || 2002–2021 || 31 May 2021 || 73 || align=left | Disc.: Kitt Peak Obs. || 
|- id="2002 CE262" bgcolor=#d6d6d6
| 0 ||  || MBA-O || 16.1 || 3.4 km || multiple || 2002–2020 || 26 May 2020 || 91 || align=left | Disc.: Kitt Peak Obs. || 
|- id="2002 CN262" bgcolor=#d6d6d6
| 0 ||  || MBA-O || 17.2 || 2.0 km || multiple || 2002–2020 || 22 Sep 2020 || 29 || align=left | Disc.: Kitt Peak Obs.Added on 17 January 2021 || 
|- id="2002 CS262" bgcolor=#E9E9E9
| 0 ||  || MBA-M || 17.1 || 2.1 km || multiple || 2002–2019 || 20 Dec 2019 || 87 || align=left | Disc.: Kitt Peak Obs.Alt.: 2013 NS2, 2014 WF100, 2016 CL21 || 
|- id="2002 CX262" bgcolor=#fefefe
| 0 ||  || MBA-I || 18.2 || data-sort-value="0.68" | 680 m || multiple || 2002–2021 || 19 Feb 2021 || 49 || align=left | Disc.: Kitt Peak Obs. || 
|- id="2002 CC264" bgcolor=#fefefe
| 1 ||  || MBA-I || 18.4 || data-sort-value="0.62" | 620 m || multiple || 2002–2021 || 08 Jun 2021 || 55 || align=left | Disc.: LPL/Spacewatch II || 
|- id="2002 CE264" bgcolor=#d6d6d6
| 0 ||  || MBA-O || 15.89 || 3.7 km || multiple || 2002–2021 || 03 Aug 2021 || 162 || align=left | Disc.: Kitt Peak Obs.Alt.: 2010 HH45, 2014 EM44 || 
|- id="2002 CG264" bgcolor=#fefefe
| 0 ||  || MBA-I || 17.8 || data-sort-value="0.82" | 820 m || multiple || 2002–2020 || 27 Apr 2020 || 92 || align=left | Disc.: Kitt Peak Obs.Alt.: 2014 OY132 || 
|- id="2002 CK264" bgcolor=#d6d6d6
| 0 ||  || MBA-O || 16.8 || 2.4 km || multiple || 2002–2021 || 18 Jan 2021 || 94 || align=left | Disc.: Kitt Peak Obs.Alt.: 2012 DZ38, 2014 ST185 || 
|- id="2002 CR264" bgcolor=#E9E9E9
| 0 ||  || MBA-M || 17.3 || 1.9 km || multiple || 2002–2020 || 02 Feb 2020 || 90 || align=left | Disc.: Kitt Peak Obs.Alt.: 2009 UK54, 2011 BS145, 2014 WK437 || 
|- id="2002 CE265" bgcolor=#fefefe
| 0 ||  || MBA-I || 18.6 || data-sort-value="0.57" | 570 m || multiple || 2002–2020 || 22 Mar 2020 || 59 || align=left | Disc.: LPL/Spacewatch IIAdded on 22 July 2020 || 
|- id="2002 CQ265" bgcolor=#d6d6d6
| 3 ||  || MBA-O || 17.5 || 1.8 km || multiple || 2002–2019 || 05 Feb 2019 || 22 || align=left | Disc.: LPL/Spacewatch IIAlt.: 2013 BE71 || 
|- id="2002 CA266" bgcolor=#E9E9E9
| 0 ||  || MBA-M || 17.71 || data-sort-value="0.85" | 850 m || multiple || 2002–2021 || 08 Dec 2021 || 80 || align=left | Disc.: SpacewatchAdded on 17 June 2021Alt.: 2006 BN48 || 
|- id="2002 CE266" bgcolor=#fefefe
| 1 ||  || HUN || 18.5 || data-sort-value="0.59" | 590 m || multiple || 2002–2020 || 01 Jan 2020 || 106 || align=left | Disc.: NEATAlt.: 2015 DJ1 || 
|- id="2002 CT266" bgcolor=#d6d6d6
| 0 ||  || MBA-O || 17.0 || 2.2 km || multiple || 2002–2019 || 26 Feb 2019 || 40 || align=left | Disc.: LPL/Spacewatch IIAdded on 22 July 2020 || 
|- id="2002 CV266" bgcolor=#E9E9E9
| 0 ||  || MBA-M || 16.48 || 2.1 km || multiple || 2002–2021 || 30 Oct 2021 || 202 || align=left | Disc.: LPL/Spacewatch IIAlt.: 2015 BT203, 2017 UP39 || 
|- id="2002 CA267" bgcolor=#fefefe
| 0 ||  || MBA-I || 18.0 || data-sort-value="0.75" | 750 m || multiple || 2002–2020 || 22 Mar 2020 || 90 || align=left | Disc.: NEAT || 
|- id="2002 CM267" bgcolor=#E9E9E9
| 0 ||  || MBA-M || 17.18 || 2.0 km || multiple || 2000–2021 || 17 Apr 2021 || 123 || align=left | Disc.: LPL/Spacewatch IIAlt.: 2016 CR156 || 
|- id="2002 CN267" bgcolor=#d6d6d6
| 0 ||  || MBA-O || 17.49 || 1.8 km || multiple || 2002–2021 || 06 Nov 2021 || 49 || align=left | Disc.: LPL/Spacewatch IIAdded on 21 August 2021 || 
|- id="2002 CL268" bgcolor=#fefefe
| 0 ||  || MBA-I || 18.71 || data-sort-value="0.54" | 540 m || multiple || 2002–2020 || 17 Apr 2020 || 64 || align=left | Disc.: NEAT || 
|- id="2002 CO268" bgcolor=#fefefe
| 1 ||  || MBA-I || 18.9 || data-sort-value="0.49" | 490 m || multiple || 2000–2017 || 18 Feb 2017 || 30 || align=left | Disc.: Kitt Peak Obs. || 
|- id="2002 CB269" bgcolor=#d6d6d6
| 0 ||  || MBA-O || 16.91 || 2.3 km || multiple || 2002–2021 || 13 Sep 2021 || 92 || align=left | Disc.: LINEAR || 
|- id="2002 CJ269" bgcolor=#E9E9E9
| 0 ||  || MBA-M || 17.17 || 1.5 km || multiple || 2002–2021 || 27 Nov 2021 || 161 || align=left | Disc.: Kitt Peak Obs.Alt.: 2012 QV1, 2013 WY84 || 
|- id="2002 CY270" bgcolor=#fefefe
| 0 ||  || MBA-I || 18.28 || data-sort-value="0.66" | 660 m || multiple || 1999–2022 || 25 Jan 2022 || 96 || align=left | Disc.: Kitt Peak Obs.Alt.: 2015 AM21 || 
|- id="2002 CH271" bgcolor=#E9E9E9
| 0 ||  || MBA-M || 17.2 || 1.5 km || multiple || 2002–2020 || 21 Apr 2020 || 123 || align=left | Disc.: Kitt Peak Obs. || 
|- id="2002 CK271" bgcolor=#fefefe
| 3 ||  || MBA-I || 18.8 || data-sort-value="0.52" | 520 m || multiple || 2002–2021 || 13 Feb 2021 || 27 || align=left | Disc.: Kitt Peak Obs.Added on 17 June 2021 || 
|- id="2002 CN271" bgcolor=#d6d6d6
| 1 ||  || MBA-O || 16.3 || 3.1 km || multiple || 2002–2019 || 31 Mar 2019 || 38 || align=left | Disc.: LPL/Spacewatch IIAdded on 22 July 2020 || 
|- id="2002 CO271" bgcolor=#E9E9E9
| 0 ||  || MBA-M || 17.64 || 1.2 km || multiple || 2002–2021 || 10 Aug 2021 || 48 || align=left | Disc.: LPL/Spacewatch II || 
|- id="2002 CQ271" bgcolor=#fefefe
| 0 ||  || MBA-I || 17.93 || data-sort-value="0.77" | 770 m || multiple || 1999–2022 || 06 Jan 2022 || 184 || align=left | Disc.: SDSSAlt.: 1999 FB82, 2014 WL255, 2016 GO201 || 
|- id="2002 CG273" bgcolor=#fefefe
| 0 ||  || MBA-I || 18.15 || data-sort-value="0.70" | 700 m || multiple || 2002–2021 || 14 Apr 2021 || 80 || align=left | Disc.: Kitt Peak Obs.Added on 22 July 2020Alt.: 2010 CT14 || 
|- id="2002 CU273" bgcolor=#d6d6d6
| E ||  || MBA-O || 17.8 || 1.5 km || single || 2 days || 10 Feb 2002 || 11 || align=left | Disc.: LPL/Spacewatch II || 
|- id="2002 CH274" bgcolor=#E9E9E9
| 0 ||  || MBA-M || 18.3 || data-sort-value="0.92" | 920 m || multiple || 2002–2019 || 23 Apr 2019 || 60 || align=left | Disc.: Spacewatch || 
|- id="2002 CL274" bgcolor=#d6d6d6
| 0 ||  || MBA-O || 16.7 || 2.5 km || multiple || 2002–2020 || 17 Aug 2020 || 29 || align=left | Disc.: SpacewatchAdded on 21 August 2021 || 
|- id="2002 CB275" bgcolor=#fefefe
| 0 ||  || MBA-I || 17.68 || data-sort-value="0.87" | 870 m || multiple || 2002–2021 || 13 May 2021 || 137 || align=left | Disc.: AMOS || 
|- id="2002 CY275" bgcolor=#d6d6d6
| 0 ||  || MBA-O || 16.64 || 2.6 km || multiple || 2002–2021 || 06 Oct 2021 || 71 || align=left | Disc.: SpacewatchAlt.: 2013 CC85 || 
|- id="2002 CL276" bgcolor=#fefefe
| 0 ||  || MBA-I || 17.95 || data-sort-value="0.76" | 760 m || multiple || 2002–2022 || 08 Jan 2022 || 39 || align=left | Disc.: NEAT || 
|- id="2002 CW276" bgcolor=#fefefe
| 0 ||  || MBA-I || 18.1 || data-sort-value="0.71" | 710 m || multiple || 2002–2020 || 20 Jan 2020 || 70 || align=left | Disc.: NEAT || 
|- id="2002 CD278" bgcolor=#fefefe
| 0 ||  || MBA-I || 17.7 || data-sort-value="0.86" | 860 m || multiple || 2002–2020 || 22 Apr 2020 || 171 || align=left | Disc.: NEATAlt.: 2013 FS19 || 
|- id="2002 CN279" bgcolor=#fefefe
| 0 ||  || MBA-I || 17.72 || data-sort-value="0.85" | 850 m || multiple || 2002–2021 || 03 May 2021 || 128 || align=left | Disc.: Spacewatch || 
|- id="2002 CT279" bgcolor=#E9E9E9
| 0 ||  || MBA-M || 17.82 || data-sort-value="0.81" | 810 m || multiple || 2002–2021 || 11 Nov 2021 || 42 || align=left | Disc.: SpacewatchAdded on 5 November 2021 || 
|- id="2002 CC282" bgcolor=#fefefe
| 0 ||  || MBA-I || 17.9 || data-sort-value="0.78" | 780 m || multiple || 2002–2019 || 26 Nov 2019 || 63 || align=left | Disc.: LPL/Spacewatch IIAlt.: 2014 KE56, 2017 BN19 || 
|- id="2002 CW286" bgcolor=#fefefe
| 0 ||  || MBA-I || 18.5 || data-sort-value="0.59" | 590 m || multiple || 2000–2020 || 03 Feb 2020 || 70 || align=left | Disc.: Spacewatch || 
|- id="2002 CA287" bgcolor=#d6d6d6
| 0 ||  || MBA-O || 16.23 || 3.2 km || multiple || 2002–2021 || 11 Sep 2021 || 83 || align=left | Disc.: NEAT || 
|- id="2002 CW288" bgcolor=#E9E9E9
| 0 ||  || MBA-M || 17.17 || 2.0 km || multiple || 2002–2021 || 22 May 2021 || 96 || align=left | Disc.: LINEARAlt.: 2014 WY492 || 
|- id="2002 CC291" bgcolor=#fefefe
| 0 ||  || MBA-I || 17.91 || data-sort-value="0.78" | 780 m || multiple || 2002–2021 || 04 May 2021 || 86 || align=left | Disc.: LINEARAlt.: 2015 VX94 || 
|- id="2002 CH292" bgcolor=#d6d6d6
| 0 ||  || MBA-O || 17.1 || 2.1 km || multiple || 2002–2019 || 06 Jul 2019 || 67 || align=left | Disc.: LINEARAlt.: 2013 EG111 || 
|- id="2002 CW292" bgcolor=#d6d6d6
| 0 ||  || MBA-O || 16.64 || 2.6 km || multiple || 2002–2021 || 04 Oct 2021 || 73 || align=left | Disc.: LINEAR || 
|- id="2002 CF293" bgcolor=#E9E9E9
| 0 ||  || MBA-M || 18.56 || data-sort-value="0.58" | 580 m || multiple || 2002–2021 || 26 Oct 2021 || 50 || align=left | Disc.: LINEAR || 
|- id="2002 CE294" bgcolor=#E9E9E9
| 0 ||  || MBA-M || 16.65 || 2.0 km || multiple || 2001–2021 || 11 Sep 2021 || 238 || align=left | Disc.: LINEARAlt.: 2011 FG96 || 
|- id="2002 CG296" bgcolor=#E9E9E9
| 0 ||  || MBA-M || 16.7 || 1.9 km || multiple || 2002–2020 || 20 Jun 2020 || 214 || align=left | Disc.: LINEARAlt.: 2014 WB495 || 
|- id="2002 CD297" bgcolor=#d6d6d6
| 0 ||  || MBA-O || 16.46 || 2.8 km || multiple || 2000–2021 || 07 Apr 2021 || 162 || align=left | Disc.: LINEARAlt.: 2014 RA35 || 
|- id="2002 CT298" bgcolor=#fefefe
| 0 ||  || MBA-I || 18.3 || data-sort-value="0.65" | 650 m || multiple || 2002–2020 || 23 Jul 2020 || 61 || align=left | Disc.: LINEAR || 
|- id="2002 CE304" bgcolor=#fefefe
| 1 ||  || HUN || 19.0 || data-sort-value="0.47" | 470 m || multiple || 2002–2021 || 15 Feb 2021 || 30 || align=left | Disc.: SpacewatchAdded on 11 May 2021Alt.: 2013 CZ247 || 
|- id="2002 CF306" bgcolor=#E9E9E9
| 0 ||  || MBA-M || 17.5 || data-sort-value="0.94" | 940 m || multiple || 2002–2020 || 17 Sep 2020 || 114 || align=left | Disc.: Kitt Peak Obs. || 
|- id="2002 CL310" bgcolor=#E9E9E9
| 0 ||  || MBA-M || 17.65 || data-sort-value="0.88" | 880 m || multiple || 2002–2021 || 04 Nov 2021 || 54 || align=left | Disc.: NEAT || 
|- id="2002 CX310" bgcolor=#E9E9E9
| 0 ||  || MBA-M || 17.56 || 1.3 km || multiple || 2002–2021 || 08 Sep 2021 || 40 || align=left | Disc.: LINEAR || 
|- id="2002 CV311" bgcolor=#fefefe
| 0 ||  || MBA-I || 18.20 || data-sort-value="0.68" | 680 m || multiple || 2000–2021 || 11 May 2021 || 117 || align=left | Disc.: LINEARAlt.: 2017 DR23 || 
|- id="2002 CY314" bgcolor=#E9E9E9
| 0 ||  || MBA-M || 17.16 || 1.1 km || multiple || 2002–2022 || 21 Jan 2022 || 183 || align=left | Disc.: NEATAlt.: 2013 WE4 || 
|- id="2002 CB315" bgcolor=#d6d6d6
| 0 ||  || MBA-O || 16.3 || 3.1 km || multiple || 2002–2021 || 09 Jan 2021 || 130 || align=left | Disc.: NEAT || 
|- id="2002 CZ315" bgcolor=#E9E9E9
| 0 ||  || MBA-M || 17.82 || 1.1 km || multiple || 2002–2021 || 08 Sep 2021 || 57 || align=left | Disc.: LPL/Spacewatch IIAlt.: 2015 BH155 || 
|- id="2002 CG316" bgcolor=#d6d6d6
| 0 ||  || MBA-O || 17.7 || 1.6 km || multiple || 2002–2019 || 29 Jul 2019 || 23 || align=left | Disc.: Kitt Peak Obs.Added on 22 July 2020 || 
|- id="2002 CH316" bgcolor=#E9E9E9
| 0 ||  || MBA-M || 16.66 || 2.0 km || multiple || 1993–2021 || 04 Sep 2021 || 152 || align=left | Disc.: NEATAlt.: 2015 BB99 || 
|- id="2002 CM316" bgcolor=#E9E9E9
| 0 ||  || MBA-M || 16.69 || 1.4 km || multiple || 2000–2021 || 26 Nov 2021 || 165 || align=left | Disc.: NEATAlt.: 2006 AF38 || 
|- id="2002 CO316" bgcolor=#d6d6d6
| 0 ||  || MBA-O || 16.38 || 2.9 km || multiple || 2002–2021 || 09 Dec 2021 || 89 || align=left | Disc.: NEATAlt.: 2006 YF4 || 
|- id="2002 CU316" bgcolor=#E9E9E9
| 0 ||  || MBA-M || 16.74 || 1.3 km || multiple || 2000–2021 || 30 Dec 2021 || 151 || align=left | Disc.: NEATAlt.: 2005 YG173, 2010 EE148, 2017 WS9 || 
|- id="2002 CY316" bgcolor=#fefefe
| 0 ||  || HUN || 18.86 || data-sort-value="0.50" | 500 m || multiple || 2002–2021 || 12 Dec 2021 || 54 || align=left | Disc.: Kitt Peak Obs. || 
|- id="2002 CK317" bgcolor=#d6d6d6
| 0 ||  || MBA-O || 16.20 || 3.2 km || multiple || 2002–2021 || 07 Sep 2021 || 92 || align=left | Disc.: NEATAlt.: 2015 PO23 || 
|- id="2002 CT317" bgcolor=#E9E9E9
| 0 ||  || MBA-M || 18.23 || data-sort-value="0.67" | 670 m || multiple || 2002–2019 || 05 Jun 2019 || 95 || align=left | Disc.: NEATAlt.: 2005 YW162 || 
|- id="2002 CV317" bgcolor=#FA8072
| 4 ||  || MCA || 20.3 || data-sort-value="0.26" | 260 m || single || 73 days || 19 Mar 2002 || 23 || align=left | Disc.: NEAT || 
|- id="2002 CX317" bgcolor=#d6d6d6
| 0 ||  || MBA-O || 17.0 || 2.2 km || multiple || 2002–2020 || 22 Jun 2020 || 64 || align=left | Disc.: NEAT || 
|- id="2002 CG318" bgcolor=#d6d6d6
| 0 ||  || MBA-O || 17.6 || 1.7 km || multiple || 2001–2020 || 05 Nov 2020 || 66 || align=left | Disc.: NEATAlt.: 2007 FP12 || 
|- id="2002 CK318" bgcolor=#E9E9E9
| 0 ||  || MBA-M || 16.3 || 2.3 km || multiple || 2002–2020 || 22 May 2020 || 265 || align=left | Disc.: NEATAlt.: 2007 FU10, 2011 GM56 || 
|- id="2002 CL318" bgcolor=#d6d6d6
| 0 ||  || MBA-O || 16.8 || 2.4 km || multiple || 2002–2021 || 18 Jan 2021 || 97 || align=left | Disc.: NEATAlt.: 2017 FN92 || 
|- id="2002 CM318" bgcolor=#d6d6d6
| 0 ||  || MBA-O || 16.1 || 3.4 km || multiple || 2002–2021 || 18 Jan 2021 || 171 || align=left | Disc.: NEAT || 
|- id="2002 CO318" bgcolor=#fefefe
| 0 ||  || MBA-I || 18.33 || data-sort-value="0.64" | 640 m || multiple || 2002–2021 || 01 Nov 2021 || 85 || align=left | Disc.: NEAT || 
|- id="2002 CP318" bgcolor=#fefefe
| 0 ||  || MBA-I || 17.52 || 1.8 km || multiple || 2002–2021 || 03 May 2021 || 185 || align=left | Disc.: NEATAlt.: 2010 CD135, 2011 SW148 || 
|- id="2002 CT318" bgcolor=#fefefe
| – ||  || MBA-I || 18.3 || data-sort-value="0.65" | 650 m || single || 18 days || 22 Feb 2002 || 7 || align=left | Disc.: NEAT || 
|- id="2002 CU318" bgcolor=#d6d6d6
| 0 ||  || MBA-O || 15.4 || 4.6 km || multiple || 2002–2020 || 30 Apr 2020 || 122 || align=left | Disc.: NEAT || 
|- id="2002 CV318" bgcolor=#E9E9E9
| 0 ||  || MBA-M || 16.58 || 2.0 km || multiple || 2002–2021 || 06 Dec 2021 || 221 || align=left | Disc.: SDSS || 
|- id="2002 CY318" bgcolor=#fefefe
| 0 ||  || MBA-I || 18.23 || data-sort-value="0.67" | 670 m || multiple || 2002–2021 || 13 May 2021 || 162 || align=left | Disc.: SDSS || 
|- id="2002 CZ318" bgcolor=#d6d6d6
| 0 ||  || MBA-O || 16.07 || 3.4 km || multiple || 2002–2021 || 11 Aug 2021 || 166 || align=left | Disc.: SDSS || 
|- id="2002 CC319" bgcolor=#d6d6d6
| 1 ||  || MBA-O || 16.3 || 3.1 km || multiple || 2002–2020 || 28 Apr 2020 || 93 || align=left | Disc.: NEAT || 
|- id="2002 CE319" bgcolor=#d6d6d6
| 0 ||  || MBA-O || 16.58 || 2.7 km || multiple || 2002–2021 || 02 Oct 2021 || 100 || align=left | Disc.: NEAT || 
|- id="2002 CG319" bgcolor=#d6d6d6
| 0 ||  || MBA-O || 16.4 || 2.9 km || multiple || 2002–2021 || 08 Jun 2021 || 89 || align=left | Disc.: Kitt Peak Obs. || 
|- id="2002 CH319" bgcolor=#E9E9E9
| 0 ||  || MBA-M || 17.0 || 1.7 km || multiple || 2002–2019 || 12 Jan 2019 || 68 || align=left | Disc.: Spacewatch || 
|- id="2002 CL319" bgcolor=#d6d6d6
| 0 ||  || MBA-O || 16.6 || 2.7 km || multiple || 2002–2020 || 22 Apr 2020 || 81 || align=left | Disc.: SDSS || 
|- id="2002 CM319" bgcolor=#E9E9E9
| 0 ||  || MBA-M || 17.5 || data-sort-value="0.94" | 940 m || multiple || 2002–2020 || 19 Nov 2020 || 111 || align=left | Disc.: Kitt Peak Obs. || 
|- id="2002 CV319" bgcolor=#d6d6d6
| 0 ||  || MBA-O || 16.8 || 2.4 km || multiple || 2002–2019 || 04 Feb 2019 || 64 || align=left | Disc.: SDSS || 
|- id="2002 CX319" bgcolor=#E9E9E9
| 0 ||  || MBA-M || 17.62 || 1.3 km || multiple || 2002–2021 || 29 Oct 2021 || 119 || align=left | Disc.: SDSS || 
|- id="2002 CY319" bgcolor=#fefefe
| 0 ||  || MBA-I || 18.6 || data-sort-value="0.57" | 570 m || multiple || 2002–2020 || 23 Jun 2020 || 66 || align=left | Disc.: LPL/Spacewatch II || 
|- id="2002 CZ319" bgcolor=#d6d6d6
| 0 ||  || MBA-O || 16.5 || 2.8 km || multiple || 2002–2019 || 15 Feb 2019 || 63 || align=left | Disc.: LPL/Spacewatch II || 
|- id="2002 CA320" bgcolor=#fefefe
| 0 ||  || MBA-I || 18.0 || data-sort-value="0.75" | 750 m || multiple || 2002–2021 || 09 Jan 2021 || 72 || align=left | Disc.: Kitt Peak Obs. || 
|- id="2002 CB320" bgcolor=#fefefe
| 0 ||  || MBA-I || 17.8 || data-sort-value="0.82" | 820 m || multiple || 2002–2020 || 15 Sep 2020 || 87 || align=left | Disc.: Spacewatch || 
|- id="2002 CC320" bgcolor=#d6d6d6
| 0 ||  || MBA-O || 16.3 || 3.1 km || multiple || 2002–2020 || 17 May 2020 || 61 || align=left | Disc.: SDSS || 
|- id="2002 CD320" bgcolor=#E9E9E9
| 0 ||  || MBA-M || 17.49 || 1.8 km || multiple || 2002–2021 || 08 Sep 2021 || 85 || align=left | Disc.: LPL/Spacewatch II || 
|- id="2002 CE320" bgcolor=#fefefe
| 0 ||  || MBA-I || 18.25 || data-sort-value="0.67" | 670 m || multiple || 2002–2021 || 03 May 2021 || 91 || align=left | Disc.: SDSS || 
|- id="2002 CF320" bgcolor=#d6d6d6
| 0 ||  || MBA-O || 16.4 || 2.9 km || multiple || 2002–2020 || 15 Dec 2020 || 117 || align=left | Disc.: LPL/Spacewatch II || 
|- id="2002 CG320" bgcolor=#d6d6d6
| 0 ||  || MBA-O || 17.2 || 2.0 km || multiple || 2002–2019 || 28 Feb 2019 || 58 || align=left | Disc.: SDSS || 
|- id="2002 CJ320" bgcolor=#fefefe
| 0 ||  || MBA-I || 17.95 || data-sort-value="0.76" | 760 m || multiple || 2002–2021 || 13 Apr 2021 || 63 || align=left | Disc.: SDSS || 
|- id="2002 CK320" bgcolor=#d6d6d6
| 0 ||  || HIL || 15.9 || 3.7 km || multiple || 2002–2019 || 24 Apr 2019 || 55 || align=left | Disc.: Spacewatch || 
|- id="2002 CN320" bgcolor=#fefefe
| 0 ||  || MBA-I || 18.6 || data-sort-value="0.57" | 570 m || multiple || 2002–2019 || 27 Sep 2019 || 63 || align=left | Disc.: Kitt Peak Obs. || 
|- id="2002 CO320" bgcolor=#fefefe
| 0 ||  || MBA-I || 17.7 || data-sort-value="0.86" | 860 m || multiple || 2002–2020 || 22 Mar 2020 || 83 || align=left | Disc.: Spacewatch || 
|- id="2002 CP320" bgcolor=#fefefe
| 0 ||  || MBA-I || 18.19 || data-sort-value="0.68" | 680 m || multiple || 2002–2021 || 15 May 2021 || 116 || align=left | Disc.: Cerro Tololo || 
|- id="2002 CQ320" bgcolor=#fefefe
| 0 ||  || MBA-I || 18.69 || data-sort-value="0.54" | 540 m || multiple || 2002–2021 || 13 May 2021 || 72 || align=left | Disc.: LPL/Spacewatch II || 
|- id="2002 CR320" bgcolor=#d6d6d6
| 0 ||  || MBA-O || 17.0 || 2.2 km || multiple || 2002–2017 || 23 Dec 2017 || 47 || align=left | Disc.: Kitt Peak Obs. || 
|- id="2002 CU320" bgcolor=#fefefe
| 0 ||  || MBA-I || 18.0 || data-sort-value="0.75" | 750 m || multiple || 2002–2021 || 18 Jan 2021 || 59 || align=left | Disc.: Kitt Peak Obs. || 
|- id="2002 CW320" bgcolor=#fefefe
| 0 ||  || MBA-I || 18.0 || data-sort-value="0.75" | 750 m || multiple || 2002–2018 || 12 Sep 2018 || 47 || align=left | Disc.: SDSS || 
|- id="2002 CX320" bgcolor=#d6d6d6
| 0 ||  || MBA-O || 16.9 || 2.3 km || multiple || 2002–2020 || 27 Apr 2020 || 61 || align=left | Disc.: SDSS || 
|- id="2002 CZ320" bgcolor=#E9E9E9
| 0 ||  || MBA-M || 17.38 || 1.4 km || multiple || 2002–2021 || 27 Nov 2021 || 162 || align=left | Disc.: Kitt Peak Obs. || 
|- id="2002 CA321" bgcolor=#d6d6d6
| 0 ||  || MBA-O || 17.5 || 1.8 km || multiple || 2002–2018 || 07 Mar 2018 || 47 || align=left | Disc.: Spacewatch || 
|- id="2002 CF321" bgcolor=#fefefe
| 0 ||  || MBA-I || 17.61 || data-sort-value="0.89" | 890 m || multiple || 2002–2022 || 27 Jan 2022 || 58 || align=left | Disc.: NEAT || 
|- id="2002 CG321" bgcolor=#E9E9E9
| 0 ||  || MBA-M || 17.4 || data-sort-value="0.98" | 980 m || multiple || 1991–2020 || 08 Dec 2020 || 98 || align=left | Disc.: Kitt Peak Obs. || 
|- id="2002 CH321" bgcolor=#d6d6d6
| 0 ||  || MBA-O || 16.66 || 2.6 km || multiple || 2002–2021 || 11 Sep 2021 || 82 || align=left | Disc.: SDSS || 
|- id="2002 CJ321" bgcolor=#E9E9E9
| 0 ||  || MBA-M || 17.7 || 1.2 km || multiple || 2002–2020 || 27 Feb 2020 || 51 || align=left | Disc.: Kitt Peak Obs. || 
|- id="2002 CK321" bgcolor=#E9E9E9
| 0 ||  || MBA-M || 18.3 || data-sort-value="0.65" | 650 m || multiple || 2002–2020 || 11 Oct 2020 || 89 || align=left | Disc.: Kitt Peak Obs. || 
|- id="2002 CM321" bgcolor=#E9E9E9
| 0 ||  || MBA-M || 17.49 || data-sort-value="0.94" | 940 m || multiple || 2002–2021 || 06 Dec 2021 || 73 || align=left | Disc.: LPL/Spacewatch II || 
|- id="2002 CO321" bgcolor=#d6d6d6
| 0 ||  || MBA-O || 16.95 || 2.3 km || multiple || 2002–2021 || 06 Nov 2021 || 74 || align=left | Disc.: SDSS || 
|- id="2002 CQ321" bgcolor=#fefefe
| 0 ||  || HUN || 18.7 || data-sort-value="0.54" | 540 m || multiple || 2002–2019 || 28 Nov 2019 || 44 || align=left | Disc.: SDSS || 
|- id="2002 CR321" bgcolor=#fefefe
| 0 ||  || MBA-I || 17.8 || data-sort-value="0.82" | 820 m || multiple || 2002–2021 || 07 Jan 2021 || 60 || align=left | Disc.: SDSS || 
|- id="2002 CS321" bgcolor=#fefefe
| 0 ||  || MBA-I || 18.6 || data-sort-value="0.57" | 570 m || multiple || 2002–2019 || 20 Dec 2019 || 50 || align=left | Disc.: LPL/Spacewatch II || 
|- id="2002 CU321" bgcolor=#d6d6d6
| 0 ||  || MBA-O || 17.38 || 1.9 km || multiple || 2002–2021 || 16 Aug 2021 || 41 || align=left | Disc.: SDSS || 
|- id="2002 CV321" bgcolor=#fefefe
| 0 ||  || MBA-I || 18.1 || data-sort-value="0.71" | 710 m || multiple || 2002–2021 || 15 Jan 2021 || 164 || align=left | Disc.: Spacewatch || 
|- id="2002 CW321" bgcolor=#d6d6d6
| 0 ||  || MBA-O || 16.69 || 2.6 km || multiple || 2002–2021 || 11 Oct 2021 || 59 || align=left | Disc.: SDSS || 
|- id="2002 CX321" bgcolor=#fefefe
| 0 ||  || MBA-I || 18.5 || data-sort-value="0.59" | 590 m || multiple || 2002–2020 || 16 Nov 2020 || 104 || align=left | Disc.: LPL/Spacewatch II || 
|- id="2002 CY321" bgcolor=#d6d6d6
| 0 ||  || MBA-O || 16.84 || 2.4 km || multiple || 2002–2021 || 11 Sep 2021 || 56 || align=left | Disc.: LPL/Spacewatch IIAlt.: 2010 LX72 || 
|- id="2002 CZ321" bgcolor=#fefefe
| 0 ||  || MBA-I || 17.4 || data-sort-value="0.98" | 980 m || multiple || 2002–2019 || 30 Nov 2019 || 94 || align=left | Disc.: SDSS || 
|- id="2002 CB322" bgcolor=#d6d6d6
| 0 ||  || MBA-O || 17.2 || 2.0 km || multiple || 2002–2017 || 11 Dec 2017 || 40 || align=left | Disc.: Kitt Peak Obs. || 
|- id="2002 CC322" bgcolor=#fefefe
| 0 ||  || MBA-I || 18.8 || data-sort-value="0.52" | 520 m || multiple || 2002–2019 || 30 Sep 2019 || 84 || align=left | Disc.: SDSS || 
|- id="2002 CD322" bgcolor=#fefefe
| 0 ||  || MBA-I || 18.2 || data-sort-value="0.68" | 680 m || multiple || 2002–2020 || 26 Jan 2020 || 43 || align=left | Disc.: Kitt Peak Obs. || 
|- id="2002 CF322" bgcolor=#fefefe
| 0 ||  || MBA-I || 18.77 || data-sort-value="0.52" | 520 m || multiple || 2002–2021 || 12 Aug 2021 || 52 || align=left | Disc.: Kitt Peak Obs. || 
|- id="2002 CG322" bgcolor=#fefefe
| 1 ||  || MBA-I || 17.6 || data-sort-value="0.90" | 900 m || multiple || 2002–2021 || 18 Jan 2021 || 44 || align=left | Disc.: Spacewatch || 
|- id="2002 CH322" bgcolor=#fefefe
| 0 ||  || MBA-I || 19.31 || data-sort-value="0.41" | 410 m || multiple || 2002–2022 || 25 Jan 2022 || 47 || align=left | Disc.: LPL/Spacewatch II || 
|- id="2002 CJ322" bgcolor=#d6d6d6
| 0 ||  || MBA-O || 17.02 || 2.2 km || multiple || 2002–2021 || 07 Nov 2021 || 74 || align=left | Disc.: Spacewatch || 
|- id="2002 CL322" bgcolor=#fefefe
| 0 ||  || MBA-I || 18.81 || data-sort-value="0.51" | 510 m || multiple || 2002–2021 || 11 Jul 2021 || 56 || align=left | Disc.: LPL/Spacewatch II || 
|- id="2002 CM322" bgcolor=#d6d6d6
| 0 ||  || MBA-O || 17.3 || 1.9 km || multiple || 2002–2018 || 24 Jan 2018 || 33 || align=left | Disc.: Kitt Peak Obs. || 
|- id="2002 CN322" bgcolor=#fefefe
| 1 ||  || MBA-I || 19.3 || data-sort-value="0.41" | 410 m || multiple || 2002–2017 || 17 Sep 2017 || 29 || align=left | Disc.: Kitt Peak Obs. || 
|- id="2002 CQ322" bgcolor=#fefefe
| 1 ||  || MBA-I || 18.8 || data-sort-value="0.52" | 520 m || multiple || 2002–2018 || 07 Sep 2018 || 44 || align=left | Disc.: Kitt Peak Obs.Alt.: 2018 PL30 || 
|- id="2002 CS322" bgcolor=#fefefe
| 0 ||  || MBA-I || 18.0 || data-sort-value="0.75" | 750 m || multiple || 2002–2019 || 29 Nov 2019 || 54 || align=left | Disc.: LPL/Spacewatch II || 
|- id="2002 CT322" bgcolor=#FA8072
| 0 ||  || HUN || 19.0 || data-sort-value="0.47" | 470 m || multiple || 2002–2018 || 04 Feb 2018 || 27 || align=left | Disc.: SDSS || 
|- id="2002 CU322" bgcolor=#d6d6d6
| 0 ||  || MBA-O || 16.4 || 2.9 km || multiple || 2002–2020 || 16 May 2020 || 35 || align=left | Disc.: LPL/Spacewatch II || 
|- id="2002 CW322" bgcolor=#d6d6d6
| 3 ||  || MBA-O || 17.6 || 1.7 km || multiple || 2002–2017 || 27 Apr 2017 || 22 || align=left | Disc.: Kitt Peak Obs. || 
|- id="2002 CX322" bgcolor=#d6d6d6
| 0 ||  || MBA-O || 16.77 || 2.5 km || multiple || 2002–2021 || 28 Sep 2021 || 50 || align=left | Disc.: SDSS || 
|- id="2002 CY322" bgcolor=#fefefe
| 0 ||  || MBA-I || 18.71 || data-sort-value="0.54" | 540 m || multiple || 2002–2022 || 25 Jan 2022 || 46 || align=left | Disc.: Kitt Peak Obs. || 
|- id="2002 CZ322" bgcolor=#d6d6d6
| 0 ||  || MBA-O || 16.89 || 2.3 km || multiple || 2002–2021 || 10 Sep 2021 || 33 || align=left | Disc.: Kitt Peak Obs. || 
|- id="2002 CA323" bgcolor=#E9E9E9
| 1 ||  || MBA-M || 19.51 || data-sort-value="0.37" | 370 m || multiple || 2002–2021 || 08 Sep 2021 || 36 || align=left | Disc.: Kitt Peak Obs. || 
|- id="2002 CB323" bgcolor=#fefefe
| 0 ||  || MBA-I || 19.0 || data-sort-value="0.47" | 470 m || multiple || 2002–2019 || 06 Sep 2019 || 281 || align=left | Disc.: Kitt Peak Obs. || 
|- id="2002 CC323" bgcolor=#fefefe
| 0 ||  || MBA-I || 18.83 || data-sort-value="0.51" | 510 m || multiple || 2002–2021 || 09 Aug 2021 || 30 || align=left | Disc.: Kitt Peak Obs. || 
|- id="2002 CD323" bgcolor=#fefefe
| 0 ||  || MBA-I || 18.17 || data-sort-value="0.69" | 690 m || multiple || 2002–2021 || 10 May 2021 || 104 || align=left | Disc.: SDSS || 
|- id="2002 CE323" bgcolor=#E9E9E9
| 0 ||  || MBA-M || 16.52 || 2.8 km || multiple || 2002–2021 || 04 Apr 2021 || 103 || align=left | Disc.: LPL/Spacewatch II || 
|- id="2002 CF323" bgcolor=#fefefe
| 0 ||  || MBA-I || 18.2 || data-sort-value="0.68" | 680 m || multiple || 2002–2019 || 21 Dec 2019 || 94 || align=left | Disc.: LPL/Spacewatch II || 
|- id="2002 CG323" bgcolor=#d6d6d6
| 0 ||  || MBA-O || 17.05 || 2.2 km || multiple || 2002–2021 || 09 Sep 2021 || 78 || align=left | Disc.: NEAT || 
|- id="2002 CJ323" bgcolor=#fefefe
| 0 ||  || MBA-I || 18.3 || data-sort-value="0.65" | 650 m || multiple || 2002–2019 || 01 Nov 2019 || 69 || align=left | Disc.: Kitt Peak Obs. || 
|- id="2002 CK323" bgcolor=#d6d6d6
| 0 ||  || MBA-O || 16.7 || 2.5 km || multiple || 2002–2020 || 17 May 2020 || 80 || align=left | Disc.: SDSS || 
|- id="2002 CL323" bgcolor=#fefefe
| 0 ||  || MBA-I || 18.6 || data-sort-value="0.57" | 570 m || multiple || 2002–2020 || 10 Dec 2020 || 73 || align=left | Disc.: Kitt Peak Obs. || 
|- id="2002 CM323" bgcolor=#fefefe
| 0 ||  || MBA-I || 18.28 || data-sort-value="0.66" | 660 m || multiple || 1997–2021 || 03 Apr 2021 || 79 || align=left | Disc.: SDSS || 
|- id="2002 CN323" bgcolor=#d6d6d6
| 0 ||  || MBA-O || 16.6 || 2.7 km || multiple || 2002–2020 || 21 May 2020 || 69 || align=left | Disc.: LPL/Spacewatch II || 
|- id="2002 CO323" bgcolor=#fefefe
| 0 ||  || MBA-I || 18.6 || data-sort-value="0.57" | 570 m || multiple || 2002–2019 || 05 Apr 2019 || 61 || align=left | Disc.: LPL/Spacewatch II || 
|- id="2002 CP323" bgcolor=#d6d6d6
| 0 ||  || MBA-O || 17.16 || 2.1 km || multiple || 2002–2021 || 08 Sep 2021 || 70 || align=left | Disc.: LPL/Spacewatch II || 
|- id="2002 CR323" bgcolor=#fefefe
| 2 ||  || MBA-I || 18.8 || data-sort-value="0.52" | 520 m || multiple || 2002–2019 || 04 Dec 2019 || 61 || align=left | Disc.: LPL/Spacewatch II || 
|- id="2002 CS323" bgcolor=#E9E9E9
| 0 ||  || MBA-M || 17.56 || 1.3 km || multiple || 2002–2021 || 26 Oct 2021 || 100 || align=left | Disc.: Spacewatch || 
|- id="2002 CT323" bgcolor=#fefefe
| 0 ||  || MBA-I || 18.47 || data-sort-value="0.60" | 600 m || multiple || 2002–2021 || 09 May 2021 || 69 || align=left | Disc.: SDSS || 
|- id="2002 CU323" bgcolor=#E9E9E9
| 0 ||  || MBA-M || 17.60 || data-sort-value="0.90" | 900 m || multiple || 2002–2021 || 03 Dec 2021 || 116 || align=left | Disc.: SpacewatchAlt.: 2010 FJ65 || 
|- id="2002 CV323" bgcolor=#fefefe
| 0 ||  || MBA-I || 18.33 || data-sort-value="0.64" | 640 m || multiple || 2002–2021 || 28 Jul 2021 || 59 || align=left | Disc.: Kitt Peak Obs. || 
|- id="2002 CW323" bgcolor=#d6d6d6
| 0 ||  || MBA-O || 16.6 || 2.7 km || multiple || 2002–2020 || 16 May 2020 || 70 || align=left | Disc.: SDSS || 
|- id="2002 CB324" bgcolor=#fefefe
| 0 ||  || MBA-I || 18.1 || data-sort-value="0.71" | 710 m || multiple || 2002–2020 || 15 Oct 2020 || 79 || align=left | Disc.: NEAT || 
|- id="2002 CD324" bgcolor=#d6d6d6
| 0 ||  || MBA-O || 16.8 || 2.4 km || multiple || 2002–2019 || 08 Feb 2019 || 58 || align=left | Disc.: SDSS || 
|- id="2002 CE324" bgcolor=#fefefe
| 0 ||  || MBA-I || 17.6 || data-sort-value="0.90" | 900 m || multiple || 2002–2019 || 25 Oct 2019 || 58 || align=left | Disc.: SDSS || 
|- id="2002 CF324" bgcolor=#E9E9E9
| 0 ||  || MBA-M || 17.2 || 2.0 km || multiple || 2002–2020 || 22 Apr 2020 || 104 || align=left | Disc.: LPL/Spacewatch II || 
|- id="2002 CG324" bgcolor=#fefefe
| 0 ||  || MBA-I || 18.07 || data-sort-value="0.72" | 720 m || multiple || 2002–2021 || 10 Apr 2021 || 70 || align=left | Disc.: Kitt Peak Obs. || 
|- id="2002 CH324" bgcolor=#E9E9E9
| 0 ||  || MBA-M || 17.8 || data-sort-value="0.82" | 820 m || multiple || 2002–2020 || 15 Oct 2020 || 66 || align=left | Disc.: Kitt Peak Obs. || 
|- id="2002 CK324" bgcolor=#fefefe
| 0 ||  || MBA-I || 17.87 || data-sort-value="0.79" | 790 m || multiple || 2002–2021 || 14 May 2021 || 73 || align=left | Disc.: Kitt Peak Obs. || 
|- id="2002 CM324" bgcolor=#E9E9E9
| 0 ||  || MBA-M || 17.3 || 1.9 km || multiple || 2002–2018 || 03 Nov 2018 || 49 || align=left | Disc.: Cerro Tololo || 
|- id="2002 CN324" bgcolor=#fefefe
| 0 ||  || MBA-I || 18.24 || data-sort-value="0.67" | 670 m || multiple || 2002–2021 || 18 May 2021 || 108 || align=left | Disc.: LPL/Spacewatch II || 
|- id="2002 CO324" bgcolor=#d6d6d6
| 0 ||  || MBA-O || 17.1 || 2.1 km || multiple || 2002–2020 || 05 Nov 2020 || 79 || align=left | Disc.: Kitt Peak Obs. || 
|- id="2002 CP324" bgcolor=#d6d6d6
| 0 ||  || MBA-O || 17.5 || 1.8 km || multiple || 2002–2021 || 18 Jan 2021 || 55 || align=left | Disc.: Kitt Peak Obs. || 
|- id="2002 CQ324" bgcolor=#E9E9E9
| 0 ||  || MBA-M || 18.09 || 1.0 km || multiple || 2002–2021 || 10 Sep 2021 || 75 || align=left | Disc.: LPL/Spacewatch II || 
|- id="2002 CR324" bgcolor=#fefefe
| 1 ||  || MBA-I || 18.1 || data-sort-value="0.71" | 710 m || multiple || 2002–2020 || 01 Jan 2020 || 55 || align=left | Disc.: Kitt Peak Obs. || 
|- id="2002 CT324" bgcolor=#E9E9E9
| 0 ||  || MBA-M || 17.38 || 1.4 km || multiple || 2002–2021 || 02 Oct 2021 || 90 || align=left | Disc.: LPL/Spacewatch II || 
|- id="2002 CV324" bgcolor=#fefefe
| 3 ||  || HUN || 19.0 || data-sort-value="0.47" | 470 m || multiple || 2002–2019 || 28 Oct 2019 || 44 || align=left | Disc.: Spacewatch || 
|- id="2002 CW324" bgcolor=#d6d6d6
| 0 ||  || MBA-O || 17.5 || 1.8 km || multiple || 2002–2019 || 03 Oct 2019 || 44 || align=left | Disc.: Kitt Peak Obs. || 
|- id="2002 CX324" bgcolor=#E9E9E9
| 0 ||  || MBA-M || 17.7 || 1.6 km || multiple || 2002–2021 || 08 May 2021 || 51 || align=left | Disc.: Kitt Peak Obs. || 
|- id="2002 CY324" bgcolor=#fefefe
| 0 ||  || MBA-I || 18.8 || data-sort-value="0.52" | 520 m || multiple || 2002–2021 || 18 Jan 2021 || 52 || align=left | Disc.: LPL/Spacewatch II || 
|- id="2002 CZ324" bgcolor=#E9E9E9
| 0 ||  || MBA-M || 17.5 || 1.8 km || multiple || 2002–2019 || 28 Dec 2019 || 52 || align=left | Disc.: SDSS || 
|- id="2002 CA325" bgcolor=#E9E9E9
| 0 ||  || MBA-M || 17.8 || 1.2 km || multiple || 2002–2020 || 15 May 2020 || 59 || align=left | Disc.: SDSSAlt.: 2010 CV243 || 
|- id="2002 CB325" bgcolor=#d6d6d6
| 1 ||  || MBA-O || 17.6 || 1.7 km || multiple || 2002–2019 || 20 Oct 2019 || 40 || align=left | Disc.: Kitt Peak Obs. || 
|- id="2002 CC325" bgcolor=#d6d6d6
| 0 ||  || MBA-O || 16.68 || 2.6 km || multiple || 2002–2021 || 09 Aug 2021 || 51 || align=left | Disc.: LPL/Spacewatch II || 
|- id="2002 CE325" bgcolor=#fefefe
| 0 ||  || HUN || 18.2 || data-sort-value="0.68" | 680 m || multiple || 2002–2020 || 14 Sep 2020 || 70 || align=left | Disc.: SDSS || 
|- id="2002 CF325" bgcolor=#fefefe
| 0 ||  || MBA-I || 18.69 || data-sort-value="0.54" | 540 m || multiple || 2002–2021 || 11 Jun 2021 || 56 || align=left | Disc.: Kitt Peak Obs. || 
|- id="2002 CG325" bgcolor=#E9E9E9
| 0 ||  || MBA-M || 17.9 || 1.1 km || multiple || 2002–2018 || 10 Dec 2018 || 42 || align=left | Disc.: SDSS || 
|- id="2002 CJ325" bgcolor=#d6d6d6
| 0 ||  || MBA-O || 16.3 || 3.1 km || multiple || 2002–2020 || 26 May 2020 || 40 || align=left | Disc.: NEAT || 
|- id="2002 CL325" bgcolor=#E9E9E9
| 1 ||  || MBA-M || 17.9 || 1.1 km || multiple || 2002–2018 || 15 Dec 2018 || 31 || align=left | Disc.: SDSS || 
|- id="2002 CM325" bgcolor=#d6d6d6
| 0 ||  || MBA-O || 17.3 || 1.9 km || multiple || 2002–2020 || 18 Jul 2020 || 34 || align=left | Disc.: SDSS || 
|- id="2002 CO325" bgcolor=#d6d6d6
| 0 ||  || MBA-O || 17.4 || 1.8 km || multiple || 2002–2021 || 04 Jan 2021 || 50 || align=left | Disc.: Kitt Peak Obs. || 
|- id="2002 CP325" bgcolor=#E9E9E9
| 0 ||  || MBA-M || 18.8 || data-sort-value="0.73" | 730 m || multiple || 2002–2018 || 17 Nov 2018 || 37 || align=left | Disc.: LPL/Spacewatch II || 
|- id="2002 CQ325" bgcolor=#d6d6d6
| 0 ||  || MBA-O || 17.2 || 2.0 km || multiple || 2002–2019 || 28 Feb 2019 || 37 || align=left | Disc.: SDSS || 
|- id="2002 CR325" bgcolor=#fefefe
| 0 ||  || MBA-I || 18.55 || data-sort-value="0.58" | 580 m || multiple || 2000–2021 || 09 May 2021 || 50 || align=left | Disc.: Kitt Peak Obs. || 
|- id="2002 CT325" bgcolor=#E9E9E9
| 1 ||  || MBA-M || 18.62 || data-sort-value="0.79" | 790 m || multiple || 2002–2021 || 07 Nov 2021 || 55 || align=left | Disc.: Kitt Peak Obs. || 
|- id="2002 CU325" bgcolor=#d6d6d6
| 0 ||  || MBA-O || 17.3 || 1.9 km || multiple || 1999–2019 || 23 Oct 2019 || 158 || align=left | Disc.: Kitt Peak Obs. || 
|- id="2002 CV325" bgcolor=#fefefe
| 0 ||  || MBA-I || 19.2 || data-sort-value="0.43" | 430 m || multiple || 2002–2019 || 02 Sep 2019 || 141 || align=left | Disc.: Kitt Peak Obs. || 
|- id="2002 CW325" bgcolor=#d6d6d6
| 0 ||  || MBA-O || 17.55 || 1.7 km || multiple || 2002–2022 || 25 Jan 2022 || 133 || align=left | Disc.: Kitt Peak Obs. || 
|- id="2002 CX325" bgcolor=#fefefe
| 0 ||  || MBA-I || 18.5 || data-sort-value="0.59" | 590 m || multiple || 2002–2019 || 25 Sep 2019 || 58 || align=left | Disc.: Kitt Peak Obs. || 
|- id="2002 CY325" bgcolor=#d6d6d6
| 0 ||  || MBA-O || 17.25 || 2.0 km || multiple || 2002–2022 || 24 Jan 2022 || 63 || align=left | Disc.: Kitt Peak Obs. || 
|- id="2002 CE326" bgcolor=#fefefe
| 0 ||  || MBA-I || 19.0 || data-sort-value="0.47" | 470 m || multiple || 2002–2019 || 30 Aug 2019 || 40 || align=left | Disc.: Kitt Peak Obs. || 
|- id="2002 CH326" bgcolor=#C2FFFF
| 0 ||  || JT || 14.71 || 6.4 km || multiple || 2002–2021 || 27 Nov 2021 || 164 || align=left | Disc.: SpacewatchGreek camp (L4) || 
|- id="2002 CJ326" bgcolor=#C2FFFF
| 0 ||  || JT || 14.70 || 6.4 km || multiple || 2002–2021 || 26 Oct 2021 || 84 || align=left | Disc.: AstrovirtelGreek camp (L4) || 
|- id="2002 CM326" bgcolor=#fefefe
| 0 ||  || MBA-I || 18.9 || data-sort-value="0.49" | 490 m || multiple || 2002–2019 || 08 Jun 2019 || 48 || align=left | Disc.: Kitt Peak Obs.Alt.: 2003 SM473 || 
|- id="2002 CO326" bgcolor=#fefefe
| 0 ||  || MBA-I || 18.2 || data-sort-value="0.68" | 680 m || multiple || 2002–2020 || 08 Sep 2020 || 65 || align=left | Disc.: Kitt Peak Obs. || 
|- id="2002 CP326" bgcolor=#E9E9E9
| 0 ||  || MBA-M || 17.6 || data-sort-value="0.90" | 900 m || multiple || 2002–2020 || 08 Nov 2020 || 107 || align=left | Disc.: Kitt Peak Obs. || 
|- id="2002 CQ326" bgcolor=#d6d6d6
| 0 ||  || MBA-O || 16.8 || 2.4 km || multiple || 2002–2019 || 05 Feb 2019 || 39 || align=left | Disc.: SDSS || 
|- id="2002 CU326" bgcolor=#d6d6d6
| 0 ||  || MBA-O || 17.42 || 1.8 km || multiple || 2002–2021 || 30 Oct 2021 || 47 || align=left | Disc.: SDSS || 
|- id="2002 CV326" bgcolor=#E9E9E9
| 0 ||  || MBA-M || 17.3 || 1.0 km || multiple || 2002–2020 || 14 Nov 2020 || 78 || align=left | Disc.: Kitt Peak Obs. || 
|- id="2002 CW326" bgcolor=#d6d6d6
| 0 ||  || MBA-O || 16.9 || 2.3 km || multiple || 2002–2020 || 23 Apr 2020 || 43 || align=left | Disc.: Kitt Peak Obs. || 
|- id="2002 CX326" bgcolor=#d6d6d6
| 0 ||  || MBA-O || 16.5 || 2.8 km || multiple || 2002–2021 || 11 Jun 2021 || 50 || align=left | Disc.: SDSS || 
|- id="2002 CY326" bgcolor=#E9E9E9
| 0 ||  || MBA-M || 17.60 || data-sort-value="0.90" | 900 m || multiple || 1996–2022 || 21 Jan 2022 || 103 || align=left | Disc.: LPL/Spacewatch II || 
|- id="2002 CZ326" bgcolor=#d6d6d6
| 0 ||  || MBA-O || 16.5 || 2.8 km || multiple || 2009–2021 || 28 Sep 2021 || 107 || align=left | Disc.: Kitt Peak Obs.Alt.: 2010 MU13 || 
|- id="2002 CA327" bgcolor=#C2FFFF
| 0 ||  || JT || 14.68 || 6.5 km || multiple || 2002–2021 || 25 Nov 2021 || 102 || align=left | Disc.: Kitt Peak Obs.Greek camp (L4) || 
|- id="2002 CC327" bgcolor=#fefefe
| 0 ||  || MBA-I || 18.6 || data-sort-value="0.57" | 570 m || multiple || 2002–2020 || 23 Oct 2020 || 48 || align=left | Disc.: SDSS || 
|- id="2002 CD327" bgcolor=#d6d6d6
| 1 ||  || MBA-O || 18.0 || 1.4 km || multiple || 2002–2017 || 18 Nov 2017 || 27 || align=left | Disc.: LPL/Spacewatch II || 
|- id="2002 CE327" bgcolor=#E9E9E9
| 0 ||  || MBA-M || 18.48 || data-sort-value="0.85" | 850 m || multiple || 2002–2021 || 09 Aug 2021 || 29 || align=left | Disc.: Spacewatch || 
|- id="2002 CF327" bgcolor=#fefefe
| 0 ||  || MBA-I || 18.5 || data-sort-value="0.59" | 590 m || multiple || 2002–2021 || 05 Jun 2021 || 49 || align=left | Disc.: Kitt Peak Obs. || 
|- id="2002 CG327" bgcolor=#E9E9E9
| 0 ||  || MBA-M || 17.38 || 1.9 km || multiple || 2002–2021 || 09 May 2021 || 82 || align=left | Disc.: NEAT || 
|- id="2002 CH327" bgcolor=#fefefe
| 0 ||  || MBA-I || 18.0 || data-sort-value="0.75" | 750 m || multiple || 2002–2019 || 04 Dec 2019 || 50 || align=left | Disc.: Kitt Peak Obs. || 
|- id="2002 CJ327" bgcolor=#fefefe
| 1 ||  || HUN || 19.1 || data-sort-value="0.45" | 450 m || multiple || 1995–2019 || 02 Oct 2019 || 56 || align=left | Disc.: SDSS || 
|- id="2002 CK327" bgcolor=#fefefe
| 0 ||  || MBA-I || 18.8 || data-sort-value="0.52" | 520 m || multiple || 1997–2019 || 04 Oct 2019 || 51 || align=left | Disc.: Kitt Peak Obs. || 
|- id="2002 CN327" bgcolor=#fefefe
| 1 ||  || MBA-I || 19.0 || data-sort-value="0.47" | 470 m || multiple || 2002–2019 || 04 Dec 2019 || 41 || align=left | Disc.: Kitt Peak Obs. || 
|- id="2002 CO327" bgcolor=#fefefe
| 0 ||  || MBA-I || 18.44 || data-sort-value="0.61" | 610 m || multiple || 2002–2021 || 08 May 2021 || 72 || align=left | Disc.: Kitt Peak Obs. || 
|- id="2002 CP327" bgcolor=#fefefe
| 0 ||  || MBA-I || 17.8 || data-sort-value="0.82" | 820 m || multiple || 2002–2019 || 06 Sep 2019 || 30 || align=left | Disc.: SDSS || 
|- id="2002 CQ327" bgcolor=#fefefe
| 0 ||  || MBA-I || 19.11 || data-sort-value="0.45" | 450 m || multiple || 2002–2021 || 14 Apr 2021 || 33 || align=left | Disc.: Kitt Peak Obs. || 
|- id="2002 CR327" bgcolor=#E9E9E9
| 1 ||  || MBA-M || 18.0 || 1.4 km || multiple || 2002–2020 || 24 Mar 2020 || 122 || align=left | Disc.: Spacewatch || 
|- id="2002 CS327" bgcolor=#E9E9E9
| 0 ||  || MBA-M || 17.7 || 1.6 km || multiple || 2002–2021 || 07 Jun 2021 || 63 || align=left | Disc.: SDSS || 
|- id="2002 CV327" bgcolor=#fefefe
| 0 ||  || MBA-I || 18.4 || data-sort-value="0.62" | 620 m || multiple || 2002–2020 || 21 Jan 2020 || 53 || align=left | Disc.: Kitt Peak Obs. || 
|- id="2002 CW327" bgcolor=#d6d6d6
| 0 ||  || MBA-O || 17.4 || 1.8 km || multiple || 2002–2019 || 02 Nov 2019 || 48 || align=left | Disc.: Kitt Peak Obs. || 
|- id="2002 CX327" bgcolor=#E9E9E9
| 0 ||  || MBA-M || 17.7 || 1.6 km || multiple || 2002–2019 || 20 Dec 2019 || 39 || align=left | Disc.: Kitt Peak Obs. || 
|- id="2002 CZ327" bgcolor=#fefefe
| 0 ||  || MBA-I || 18.5 || data-sort-value="0.59" | 590 m || multiple || 2002–2020 || 15 Dec 2020 || 44 || align=left | Disc.: Kitt Peak Obs. || 
|- id="2002 CA328" bgcolor=#fefefe
| 0 ||  || MBA-I || 18.3 || data-sort-value="0.65" | 650 m || multiple || 1994–2021 || 18 Jan 2021 || 51 || align=left | Disc.: Spacewatch || 
|- id="2002 CB328" bgcolor=#E9E9E9
| 0 ||  || MBA-M || 17.79 || 1.5 km || multiple || 2002–2021 || 08 Jun 2021 || 44 || align=left | Disc.: SDSS || 
|- id="2002 CC328" bgcolor=#fefefe
| 0 ||  || MBA-I || 18.40 || data-sort-value="0.62" | 620 m || multiple || 2002–2021 || 08 Apr 2021 || 60 || align=left | Disc.: Kitt Peak Obs. || 
|- id="2002 CF328" bgcolor=#E9E9E9
| 0 ||  || MBA-M || 18.0 || 1.1 km || multiple || 2002–2020 || 20 May 2020 || 62 || align=left | Disc.: LPL/Spacewatch II || 
|- id="2002 CG328" bgcolor=#C2FFFF
| 0 ||  || JT || 14.66 || 6.5 km || multiple || 2002–2021 || 27 Nov 2021 || 61 || align=left | Disc.: Kitt Peak Obs.Greek camp (L4) || 
|- id="2002 CH328" bgcolor=#fefefe
| 0 ||  || MBA-I || 18.1 || data-sort-value="0.71" | 710 m || multiple || 2002–2019 || 05 Nov 2019 || 38 || align=left | Disc.: LPL/Spacewatch II || 
|- id="2002 CJ328" bgcolor=#d6d6d6
| 4 ||  || MBA-O || 17.8 || 1.5 km || multiple || 2002–2019 || 02 Nov 2019 || 16 || align=left | Disc.: Kitt Peak Obs.Added on 22 July 2020 || 
|- id="2002 CK328" bgcolor=#d6d6d6
| 1 ||  || MBA-O || 17.3 || 1.9 km || multiple || 2002–2019 || 28 Aug 2019 || 37 || align=left | Disc.: LPL/Spacewatch IIAdded on 22 July 2020 || 
|- id="2002 CL328" bgcolor=#fefefe
| 0 ||  || MBA-I || 18.4 || data-sort-value="0.62" | 620 m || multiple || 2002–2020 || 16 Mar 2020 || 67 || align=left | Disc.: SpacewatchAdded on 22 July 2020 || 
|- id="2002 CM328" bgcolor=#E9E9E9
| 0 ||  || MBA-M || 17.42 || 1.4 km || multiple || 2002–2021 || 26 Nov 2021 || 99 || align=left | Disc.: LPL/Spacewatch IIAdded on 22 July 2020Alt.: 2010 GA18 || 
|- id="2002 CN328" bgcolor=#d6d6d6
| 0 ||  || MBA-O || 16.99 || 2.2 km || multiple || 2002–2021 || 07 Sep 2021 || 55 || align=left | Disc.: SpacewatchAdded on 22 July 2020 || 
|- id="2002 CS328" bgcolor=#fefefe
| 1 ||  || MBA-I || 19.5 || data-sort-value="0.37" | 370 m || multiple || 2000–2018 || 11 Nov 2018 || 30 || align=left | Disc.: Kitt Peak Obs.Added on 19 October 2020 || 
|- id="2002 CV328" bgcolor=#d6d6d6
| 0 ||  || MBA-O || 17.4 || 1.8 km || multiple || 2002–2020 || 16 Sep 2020 || 34 || align=left | Disc.: Kitt Peak Obs.Added on 17 January 2021 || 
|- id="2002 CW328" bgcolor=#C2FFFF
| 0 ||  || JT || 14.81 || 6.1 km || multiple || 2002–2021 || 31 Oct 2021 || 30 || align=left | Disc.: SDSSAdded on 21 August 2021Greek camp (L4)Alt.: 2014 EE124 || 
|- id="2002 CX328" bgcolor=#fefefe
| 0 ||  || MBA-I || 18.48 || data-sort-value="0.60" | 600 m || multiple || 2002–2021 || 29 Oct 2021 || 75 || align=left | Disc.: Kitt Peak Obs.Added on 9 March 2021 || 
|- id="2002 CY328" bgcolor=#fefefe
| 0 ||  || MBA-I || 18.87 || data-sort-value="0.50" | 500 m || multiple || 2002–2020 || 08 Dec 2020 || 41 || align=left | Disc.: LPL/Spacewatch IIAdded on 11 May 2021 || 
|- id="2002 CZ328" bgcolor=#fefefe
| 0 ||  || MBA-I || 18.4 || data-sort-value="0.62" | 620 m || multiple || 2002–2021 || 13 Feb 2021 || 67 || align=left | Disc.: LPL/Spacewatch IIAdded on 11 May 2021 || 
|- id="2002 CA329" bgcolor=#d6d6d6
| 0 ||  || MBA-O || 17.23 || 2.0 km || multiple || 2002–2021 || 08 Dec 2021 || 45 || align=left | Disc.: SpacewatchAdded on 21 August 2021 || 
|- id="2002 CB329" bgcolor=#E9E9E9
| 0 ||  || MBA-M || 17.72 || 1.2 km || multiple || 2002–2021 || 11 Nov 2021 || 43 || align=left | Disc.: SDSSAdded on 21 August 2021 || 
|- id="2002 CC329" bgcolor=#d6d6d6
| 0 ||  || MBA-O || 17.14 || 2.1 km || multiple || 2002–2021 || 12 Sep 2021 || 43 || align=left | Disc.: Kitt Peak Obs.Added on 21 August 2021 || 
|- id="2002 CF329" bgcolor=#FFE699
| 3 ||  || Asteroid || 16.6 || 2.7 km || multiple || 2002–2013 || 17 Mar 2013 || 19 || align=left | Disc.: SpacewatchAdded on 5 November 2021MBA at MPC || 
|- id="2002 CG329" bgcolor=#d6d6d6
| 0 ||  || MBA-O || 17.21 || 2.0 km || multiple || 1995–2021 || 30 Nov 2021 || 51 || align=left | Disc.: No observationsAdded on 29 January 2022 || 
|}
back to top

References 
 

Lists of unnumbered minor planets